This is a list of the nationally designated protected areas of China.  There are many forms of protected areas in China. Based on their relative importance, each type of protected area can be further graded into two to three levels (national, provincial and prefectural/county level).  Nevertheless, the highest rank for "pocket nature preserve" (social and mass-based), "no-hunting area", "no-fishing area", "no-logging area", "wild medicinal material resources conservation area", "crop germplasm resources conservation area", "forest tree germplasm resources conservation area" or "source water protection area" is practically restricted to provincial level.  The local government at county level is also responsible for the delimitation and declaration of "basic farmland protection area" and "basic grassland".

Take note that many protected areas in China have multiple official designations, and the statutory boundaries of these multi-designated PAs may be identical or may vary one from the other.  For instance, the boundaries of Huangshan NSHA coincide with those of the Huangshan NGP, whereas Fujian province's Wuyi Mountains NNR, NSHA and NFP are adjacent to each other.  In Heilongjiang, 27,642.14 hectares out of 115,340.27 hectares of Huzhong NFP are intersected with the experiment zone of Huzhong NNR.

National Park System and NPS Pilot Program
Ratified by: State Council
Number of Est. NPs (unit): 5 (as at September 30, 2021)
Area of NPs (10,000 km2): 23 (excl. pilot sites, as of 2021)
Total Number of NPs (unit, incl. pilot sites): 10 (as of 2021)
Sanjiangyuan National Park, coverage:
Qangtang NNR, Tibet (part, TBC)
Hoh Xil NNR, Qinghai
Sanjiangyuan NNR, Qinghai (part, approx. 51%)
Huangheyuan Water Park, Madoi, Qinghai (national-level)
Gyaring Hu Ngoring Hu Gymnocypris eckloni et Platypharodon extremus NAGRCA, Qinghai
Qumar He Endemic Fishes NAGRCA, Qinghai
Giant Panda National Park, coverage:
Wolong NNR, Sichuan 
Fengtongzhai NNR, Sichuan
Tangjiahe NNR, Sichuan
Longxi – Hongkou NNR, Sichuan
Wanglang NNR, Sichuan
Baishuihe NNR, Sichuan
Xuebaoding NNR, Sichuan
Xiaozhaizigou NNR, Sichuan
Liziping NNR, Sichuan
Qianfoshan NNR, Sichuan
Foping NNR, Shaanxi
Taibaishan NNR, Shaanxi
Zhouzhi NNR, Shaanxi
Changqing NNR, Shaanxi
Tianhuashan NNR, Shaanxi
Sangyuan NNR, Shaanxi
Taibai Xushuihe Valuable and Rare Aquatic Organisms NNR, Shaanxi
Huangbaiyuan NNR, Shaanxi
Laoxiancheng NNR, Shaanxi
Guanyinshan NNR, Shaanxi
Baishuijiang NNR, Gansu
Huanglongsi SHA of Huanglongsi – Jiuzhaigou NSHA, Sichuan
Qingcheng Houshan Scenery Area of Qingchengshan – Dujiangyan NSHA, Sichuan
Xiling Xueshan NSHA, Sichuan
Bailonghu NSHA, Sichuan
Longmenshan NSHA, Sichuan
Longmenshan NGP, Sichuan
Anxian Bioherm NGP, Sichuan
Huanglong NGP, Sichuan
Dujiangyan NFP, Sichuan
Wawushan NFP, Sichuan
Xiling NFP, Sichuan
Longcanggou NFP, Sichuan
Longmenshan NFP, Sichuan
Qianfoshan NFP, Sichuan
Erlangshan NFP, Sichuan
Beichuan NFP, Sichuan
Jiguanshan NFP, Sichuan
Tianhuashan NFP, Shaanxi
Qingfengxia NFP, Shaanxi
Northeast China Tiger and Leopard National Park, coverage: 
Hunchun Northeast China Tiger NNR, Jilin
Wangqing NNR, Jilin
Muling Japanese Yew NNR, Heilongjiang
Laoyeling Northeast China Tiger NNR, Heilongjiang
Lanjia Daxiagu NFP, Jilin
Liufengshan NFP, Heilongjiang
Wangqing Gayahe NWP, Jilin
Mijianghe Chum Salmon NAGRCA, Jilin
Hainan Tropical Rainforest National Park, coverage:
Bawangling NNR
Jianfengling NNR
Wuzhishan NNR
Diaoluoshan NNR
Yinggeling NNR
Jianfengling NFP
Diaoluoshan NFP
Limushan NFP
Bawangling NFP
Wuyishan National Park, coverage:
Wuyishan NNR, Fujian
Jiangxi Wuyishan NNR, Jiangxi
Wuyishan NSHA, Fujian
Wuyishan NFP, Fujian
Wuyi Tianchi NFP, Fujian
Ehushan NFP, Jiangxi
Jiuquxi Spinibarbus caldwelli NAGRCA, Fujian
Zhejiang Qianjiangyuan – Baishanzu National Park System Pilot Site, coverage:
Fengyangshan – Baishanzu NNR
Gutianshan NNR
Qianjiangyuan NFP
Qingyuan NFP
Qingyuan Chinese Giant Salamander NAGRCA
Hubei Shennongjia National Park System Pilot Site, coverage:
Shennongjia NNR
Shennongjia NGP
Shennongjia NFP
Shennongjia Dajiuhu NWP
Hunan Nanshan National Park System Pilot Site, coverage:
Jintongshan NNR
Nanshan NSHA
Liangjiang Xiagu NFP
Chengbu Baiyunhu NWP
Yunnan Bodaco National Park System Pilot Site, coverage:
Hongshan Scenery Area (part, incl. lakes of Bitahai & Xodo) of Sanjiangbingliu NSHA 
Qilianshan National Park System Pilot Site, coverage:
Qilianshan NNR, Gansu
Yanchiwan NNR, Gansu
Tianzhu Sanxia NFP, Gansu
Xianmi NFP, Qinghai
Qilian Heiheyuan NWP, Qinghai

National Culture Park System Pilot Program
Great Wall National Culture Park System Pilot Site
Grand Canal National Culture Park System Pilot Site
Long March National Culture Park System Pilot Site
Yellow River National Culture Park System Pilot Site
Yangtze River National Culture Park System Pilot Site

National Nature Reserves of China
Ratified by: State Council
Number of NNRs (unit): 474 (as at May 31, 2018)
Area of NNRs (10,000 ha): 9,745 (as of 2017)
Total Number of NRs (unit): 2,750 (as of 2017)
Area of NRs (10,000 ha): 14,717 (as of 2017)
Percentage of Terrestrial NR in the Land Area (%): 14.86 (as of 2017)

See: National Nature Reserves of China

National Scenic and Historic Areas of China
Ratified by: State Council
Number of NSHAs (unit): 244 (as at March 21, 2017)
Area of NSHAs (10,000 km2): 10.36
Total Number of SHAs (unit): 1,051
Area of SHAs (10,000 km2): 19.56
Percentage of SHAs in the Land Area (%): 2.03
Beijing
Badaling – Shisanling Scenic and Historic Area
Shihuadong Scenic and Historic Area
Tianjin
Panshan Scenic and Historic Area
Hebei
Chengde Bishushanzhuang Waibamiao Scenic and Historic Area
Qinhuangdao Beidaihe Scenic and Historic Area
Yesanpo Scenic and Historic Area
Cangyanshan Scenic and Historic Area
Zhangshiyan Scenic and Historic Area
Xibaipo - Tianguishan Scenic and Historic Area
Kongshan Baiyundong Scenic and Historic Area
Taihang Daxiagu Scenic and Historic Area
Xiangtangshan Scenic and Historic Area
Wahuanggong Scenic and Historic Area
Shanxi
Wutaishan Scenic and Historic Area
Hengshan Scenic and Historic Area, Hunyuan
Huanghe Hukou Pubu Scenic and Historic Area (trans-provincial NHSA, shared with Shaanxi)
Beiwudangshan Scenic and Historic Area
Wulaofeng Scenic and Historic Area
Qikou Scenic and Historic Area
Inner Mongolia
Zalantun Scenic and Historic Area
Ergun Scenic and Historic Area
Liaoning
Anshan Qianshan Scenic and Historic Area
Yalujiang Scenic and Historic Area
Jinshitan Scenic and Historic Area
Xingcheng Haibin Scenic and Historic Area
Dalian Haibin - Lüshunkou Scenic and Historic Area
Fenghuangshan Scenic and Historic Area
Benxi Shuidong Scenic and Historic Area
Qingshangou Scenic and Historic Area
Yiwulüshan Scenic and Historic Area
Jilin
Songhuahu Scenic and Historic Area
"Badabu" - Jingyuetan Scenic and Historic Area
Xianjingtai Scenic and Historic Area
Fangchuan Scenic and Historic Area
Heilongjiang
Jingpohu Scenic and Historic Area
Wudalianchi Scenic and Historic Area
Taiyangdao Scenic and Historic Area
Dazhanhe Scenic and Historic Area
Jiangsu
Taihu Scenic and Historic Area
Nanjing Zhongshan Scenic and Historic Area
Yuntaishan Scenic and Historic Area
Shugang Shouxihu Scenic and Historic Area
Sanshan Scenic and Historic Area
Zhejiang
Hangzhou Xihu Scenic and Historic Area
Fuchunjiang - Xin'anjiang Scenic and Historic Area
Yandangshan Scenic and Historic Area
Putuoshan Scenic and Historic Area
Tiantaishan Scenic and Historic Area, Tiantai
Shengsi Liedao Scenic and Historic Area
Nanxijiang Scenic and Historic Area
Moganshan Scenic and Historic Area
Xuedoushan Scenic and Historic Area
Shuanglong Scenic and Historic Area
Xiandu Scenic and Historic Area
Jianglangshan Scenic and Historic Area
Xianju Scenic and Historic Area
Huanjiang - Wuxie Scenic and Historic Area
Fangyan Scenic and Historic Area
Baizhangji - Feiyunhu Scenic and Historic Area
Fangshan - Changyu Dongtian Scenic and Historic Area
Tianmushan Scenic and Historic Area, Xinchang
Dahongyan Scenic and Historic Area 
Dapanshan Scenic and Historic Area
Taozhu Scenic and Historic Area
Xianhuashan Scenic and Historic Area
Anhui
Huangshan Scenic and Historic Area
Jiuhuashan Scenic and Historic Area
Tianzhushan Scenic and Historic Area
Langyashan Scenic and Historic Area
Qiyunshan Scenic and Historic Area
Caishi Scenic and Historic Area
Chaohu Scenic and Historic Area
Huashan Miku - Jianjiang Scenic and Historic Area
Taijidong Scenic and Historic Area
Huatinghu Scenic and Historic Area
Longchuan Scenic and Historic Area
Qishan - Pingtianhu Scenic and Historic Area
Fujian
Wuyishan Scenic and Historic Area
Qingyuanshan Scenic and Historic Area
Gulangyu - Wanshishan Scenic and Historic Area
Taimushan Scenic and Historic Area
Taoyuandong - Linyin Shilin Scenic and Historic Area
Taining Scenic and Historic Area
Yuanyangxi Scenic and Historic Area
Haitan Scenic and Historic Area
Guanzhishan Scenic and Historic Area (locally pronounced Guanzhaishan)
Gushan Scenic and Historic Area
Yuhuadong Scenic and Historic Area
Shibachongxi Scenic and Historic Area
Qingyunshan Scenic and Historic Area
Fozishan Scenic and Historic Area
Baoshan Scenic and Historic Area
Fu'an Baiyunshan Scenic and Historic Area
Lingtongshan Scenic and Historic Area
Meizhoudao Scenic and Historic Area
Jiulongji Scenic and Historic Area
Jiangxi
Lushan Scenic and Historic Area
Jinggangshan Scenic and Historic Area
Sanqingshan Scenic and Historic Area
Longhushan Scenic and Historic Area
Xiannühu Scenic and Historic Area
Sanbaishan Scenic and Historic Area
Meiling - Tengwangge Scenic and Historic Area
Guifeng Scenic and Historic Area
Gaoling - Yaoli Scenic and Historic Area
Wugongshan Scenic and Historic Area
Yunjushan - Zhelinhu Scenic and Historic Area
Lingshan Scenic and Historic Area
Shennongyuan Scenic and Historic Area
Damaoshan Scenic and Historic Area
Ruijin Scenic and Historic Area
Xiaowudang Scenic and Historic Area
Yangqishan Scenic and Historic Area
Hanxianyan Scenic and Historic Area
Shandong
Taishan Scenic and Historic Area
Qingdao Laoshan Scenic and Historic Area
Jiaodong Bandao Haibin Scenic and Historic Area
Boshan Scenic and Historic Area
Qingzhou Scenic and Historic Area
Qianfoshan Scenic and Historic Area
Henan
Jigongshan Scenic and Historic Area
Luoyang Longmen Scenic and Historic Area
Songshan Scenic and Historic Area
Wangwushan – Yuntaishan Scenic and Historic Area
Shirenshan Scenic and Historic Area
Linlüshan Scenic and Historic Area
Qingtianhe Scenic and Historic Area
Shennongshan Scenic and Historic Area
Tongbaishan - Huaiyuan Scenic and Historic Area
Zhengzhou Huanghe Scenic and Historic Area
Hubei
Wuhan Donghu Scenic and Historic Area
Wudangshan Scenic and Historic Area
Changjiang Sanxia Scenic and Historic Area (trans-provincial NHSA, shared with Chongqing)
Dahongshan Scenic and Historic Area
Longzhong Scenic and Historic Area
Jiugongshan Scenic and Historic Area
Lushui Scenic and Historic Area
Danjiangkou Shuiku Scenic and Historic Area
Hunan
Hengshan Scenic and Historic Area, Hengyang
Wulingyuan Scenic and Historic Area
Yueyanglou Dongtinghu Scenic and Historic Area
Shaoshan Scenic and Historic Area
Yuelushan Scenic and Historic Area
Langshan Scenic and Historic Area
Mengdonghe Scenic and Historic Area
Taohuayuan Scenic and Historic Area
Ziquejie Titian - Meishan Longgong Scenic and Historic Area
Dehang Scenic and Historic Area
Suxianling - Wanhuayan Scenic and Historic Area
Nanshan Scenic and Historic Area
Wanfoshan - Dongzhai Scenic and Historic Area
Huxingshan - Huayao Scenic and Historic Area
Dongjianghu Scenic and Historic Area
Fenghuang Scenic and Historic Area
Weishan Scenic and Historic Area
Yandiling Scenic and Historic Area
Baishuidong Scenic and Historic Area
Jiuyishan – Shundiling Scenic and Historic Area
Liye – Wulongshan Scenic and Historic Area
Guangdong
Zhaoqing Xinghu Scenic and Historic Area
Xiqiaoshan Scenic and Historic Area
Danxiashan Scenic and Historic Area
Baiyunshan Scenic and Historic Area
Huizhou Xihu Scenic and Historic Area
Luofushan Scenic and Historic Area
Huguangyan Scenic and Historic Area
Wutongshan Scenic and Historic Area
Guangxi
Guilin Lijiang Scenic and Historic Area
Guiping Xishan Scenic and Historic Area
Huashan Scenic and Historic Area
Hainan
Sanya Redai Haibin Scenic and Historic Area
Chongqing
Changjiang Sanxia Scenic and Historic Area (trans-provincial NSHA, shared with Hubei)
Chongqing Jinyunshan Scenic and Historic Area
Jinfoshan Scenic and Historic Area
Simianshan Scenic and Historic Area
Furongjiang Scenic and Historic Area
Tiankeng Difeng Scenic and Historic Area
Tanzhangxia Scenic and Historic Area
Sichuan
Emeishan Scenic and Historic Area
Huanglongsi - Jiuzhaigou Scenic and Historic Area
Qingchengshan -Dujiangyan Scenic and Historic Area
Jianmen Shudao Scenic and Historic Area
Konggar Shan Scenic and Historic Area
Shunan Zhuhai Scenic and Historic Area
Xiling Xueshan Scenic and Historic Area
Siguniangshan Scenic and Historic Areas
Shihai Dongxiang Scenic and Historic Area
Qionghai - Luojishan Scenic and Historic Area
Bailonghu Scenic and Historic Area
Guangwushan - Nuoshuihe Scenic and Historic Area
Tiantaishan Scenic and Historic Area, Qionglai
Longmenshan Scenic and Historic Area
Micangshan Daxiagu Scenic and Historic Area
Guizhou
Huangguoshu Scenic and Historic Area
Zhijindong Scenic and Historic Area
Wuyanghe Scenic and Historic Area
Hongfenghu Scenic and Historic Area
Longgong Scenic and Historic Area
Libo Zhangjiang Scenic and Historic Area
Chishui Scenic and Historic Area
Malinghe Xiagu Scenic and Historic Area
Duyun Doupengshan - Jianjiang Scenic and Historic Area
Jiudongtian Scenic and Historic Area
Jiulongdong Scenic and Historic Area
Liping Dongxiang Scenic and Historic Area
Ziyun Getuhe Chuandong Scenic and Historic Area
Pingtang Scenic and Historic Area
Rongjiang Miaoshan Dongshui Scenic and Historic Area
Shiqian Wenquanqun Scenic and Historic Area
Yanhe Wujiang Shanxia Scenic and Historic Area
Weng'an Jiangjiehe Scenic and Historic Area
Yunnan
Lunan Shilin Scenic and Historic Area (officially designated name.  “Lunan Yi Autonomous County” was renamed as “Shilin Yi Autonomous County” on October 8, 1998.)
Dali Scenic and Historic Area
Xishuangbanna Scenic and Historic Area
Sanjiangbingliu Scenic and Historic Area
Kunming Dianchi Scenic and Historic Area
Lijiang Yulong Xueshan Scenic and Historic Area
Tengchong Dire Huoshan Scenic and Historic Area
Ruilijiang - Dayingjiang Scenic and Historic Area
Jiuxiang Scenic and Historic Area
Jianshui Scenic and Historic Area
Puzhehei Scenic and Historic Area
Alu Scenic and Historic Area
Tibet
Yarlung He Scenic and Historic Area
Namco - Nyainqêntanglha Shan Scenic and Historic Area
Tanggulashan - Nujiangyuan Scenic and Historic Area
Tulin - Gugê Scenic and Historic Area
Shaanxi
Huashan Scenic and Historic Area
Lintong Lishan Scenic and Historic Area
Huanghe Hukou Pubu Scenic and Historic Area (trans-provincial NSHA, shared with Shanxi)
Baoji Tiantaishan Scenic and Historic Area
Huangdiling Scenic and Historic Area
Heyang Qiachuan Scenic and Historic Area (Qiachuan: locally pronounced Hechuan)
Gansu
Maijishan Scenic and Historic Area
Kongtongshan Scenic and Historic Area
Mingshashan - Yueyaquan Scenic and Historic Area
Guanshan Lianhuatai Scenic and Historic Area
Qinghai
Qinghaihu Scenic and Historic Area
Ningxia
Xixia Wangling Scenic and Historic Area
Xumishan Shiku Scenic and Historic Area
Xinjiang
Tianshan Tianchi Scenic and Historic Area
Kumtag Shamo Scenic and Historic Area
Bosten Hu Scenic and Historic Area
Sairam Hu Scenic and Historic Area
Lopren Cunzhai Scenic and Historic Area (alt. “Lop People's Village”)
Tomur Daxiagu Scenic and Historic Area

State Key Protected Fossils' Concentration Origins of China
Ratified by: Ministry of Land and Resources
Number of SKPFCOs (unit): 53 (as at December 28, 2016) 
Hebei
Nihewan Fossils' Origin
Shanxi
Yushe Fossils' Origin
Ningwu Fossils' Origin
Zhangzi Fossils' Origin
Wutaishan Fossils' Origin
Inner Mongolia
Erennhot Fossils' Origin
Ningcheng Fossils' Origin
Ordos Fossils' Origin
Bayannur Fossils' Origin
Siziwang Fossils' Origin (Siziwang = Dorbod)
Sonid Left Banner Fossils' Origin
Liaoning
Chaoyang Fossils' Origin
Yixian Fossils' Origin
Jianchang Fossils' Origin
Beipiao Fossils' Origin
Benxi Fossils' Origin
Jilin
Qian'an Fossils' Origin
Baishan Fossils' Origin
Yanji Fossils' Origin
Heilongjiang
Jiayin Fossils' Origin
Qinggang Fossils' Origin
Zhejiang
Dongyang Fossils' Origin
Tiantai Fossils' Origin
Anhui
Qianshan Fossils' Origin
Chaohu Fossils' Origin
Xiuning Fossils' Origin
Fujian
Sanming Fossils' Origin
Shandong
Shanwang Fossils' Origin
Zhucheng Fossils' Origin
Laiyang Fossils' Origin
Henan
Ruyang Fossils' Origin
Hubei
Songzi Fossils' Origin
Nanzhang Fossils' Origin
Yuan'an Fossils' Origin
Yunxian Fossils' Origin, Yunyang District, Shiyan City
Hunan
Zhuzhou Fossils' Origin
Sangzhi Fossils' Origin
Guangdong
Nanxiong Fossils' Origin
Heyuan Fossils' Origin
Guangxi
Fusui Fossils' Origin
Chongqing
Qijiang Fossils' Origin
Sichuan
Zigong Fossils' Origin
Shehong Fossils' Origin
Guizhou
Guanling Fossils' Origin
Qiandongnan Fossils' Origin
Xingyi Fossils' Origin
Panxian Fossils' Origin
Yunnan
Lufeng Fossils' Origin
Chengjiang Fossils' Origin
Luoping Fossils' Origin
Gansu
Hezheng Fossils' Origin
Xinjiang
Shanshan Fossils' Origin
Hami Fossils' Origin

National Typical Earthquake Sites of China
Ratified by: China Earthquake Administration
Total Number of NTESs (unit): 6 (as of 2007)
Shandong
Site of Seismically Active Fault at Maipo, Tancheng
Site of Collapse-Crack Earthquake at Xiong'er Hill, Zaozhuang
Chongqing
Site of Ancient Earthquake at Xiaonanhai, Qianjiang
Yunnan
Site of Large Earthquake-formed “Heavenly Pit” at Hongshi Cliff, Yongsheng ("Heavenly Pit": a massive sinkhole.  Designated name: “Yongsheng Hongshiya National Earthquake Site”.)
Ningxia
Site of Earthquake-induced Landslide and Dammed Lake at Dangjiacha, Xiji
Site of Large Earthquake and Active Fault Zone in Haiyuan †

†: The official name is yet to be verified.

National Geoparks of China
Ratified by: State Forestry and Grassland Administration
Number of NGPs (unit): 281 (incl. 226 approved sites & 55 pre-qualified sites; excl. 2 revoked pre-qualified sites, as at June 21, 2021) †
Total Number of GPs (unit): 613 (excl. GGPs, as of 2019)
Beijing
Shihuadong National Geopark
Yanqing Petrified Wood National Geopark
Shidu National Geopark
Miyun Yunmengshan National Geopark
Pinggu Huangsongyu National Geopark
Tianjin
Jixian National Geopark
Hebei
Laiyuan Baishishan National Geopark
Fuping Tianshengqiao National Geopark (Tianshengqiao: literally "Natural Bridge", a proper name for the park)
Qinhuangdao Liujiang National Geopark
Zanhuang Zhangshiyan National Geopark
Laishui Yesanpo National Geopark
Lincheng National Geopark
Wu'an National Geopark
Xinglong National Geopark
Qian'an National Geopark
Chengde Danxia Landform National Geopark
Xingtai Canyon Group National Geopark
Shanxi
Huanghe Hukou Pubu National Geopark (trans-provincial NGP, shared with Shaanxi)
Wutaishan National Geopark
Huguan Canyon National Geopark
Ningwu Ice Cave National Geopark
Lingchuan Wangmangling National Geopark
Datong Volcano Group National Geopark
Pingshun Tianjishan National Geopark
Yonghe Yellow River Meander National Geopark
Yushe Paleo-organism Fossils Geopark
Youyu Volcanic Necks Geopark
Xixian Loess Geopark
Inner Mongolia
Hexigten National Geopark
Arxan National Geopark
Alxa Desert National Geopark
Erenhot National Geopark
Ningcheng National Geopark
Bayannur National Geopark
Ordos National Geopark
Qingshuihe Laoniuwan National Geopark
Siziwang Geopark (Siziwang = Dorbod)
Oroqen Geopark
Xilin Gol Caoyuan Volcano Geopark
Qiguoshan Geopark, Bairin Left Banner
Ulanqab National Geopark
Liaoning
Chaoyang Bird Fossils National Geopark
Dalian Coast National Geopark
Benxi National Geopark
Dalian Bingyugou National Geopark
Jinzhou Paleo-organism Fossils and Granite National Geopark
Huludao Longtan Daxiagu Geopark
Jilin
Jingyu Volcano and Mineral Spring Cluster National Geopark
Changbaishan Volcano National Geopark
Qian'an Mud Forest National Geopark
Fusong National Geopark
Siping Geopark
Longwan Volcano Geopark, Huinan
Heilongjiang
Wudalianchi Volcanic Landforms National Geopark
Jiayin Dinosaur National Geopark
Yichun Granite Stone Forest National Geopark
Jingpohu National Geopark
Xingkaihu National Geopark
Yichun Xiao Hinggan Ling National Geopark
Fenghuangshan National Geopark
Shankou Geopark
Mohe National Geopark
Qinggang Mammoth Geopark
Jiguanshan Geopark
Shanghai
Chongmingdao National Geopark
Jiangsu
Suzhou Taihu Xishan National Geopark
Luhe National Geopark 
Jiangning Tangshan Fangshan National Geopark
Lianyungang Huaguoshan National Geopark
Zhejiang
Changshan National Geopark
Linhai National Geopark
Yandangshan National Geopark
Xinchang Petrified Wood National Geopark
Xianju Shenxianju Geopark
Jinyun Xiandu Geopark
Cangnan Fanshan National Geopark
Anhui
Huangshan National Geopark
Qiyunshan National Geopark
Fushan National Geopark
Huainan Bagongshan National Geopark
Qimen Guniujiang National Geopark
Tianzhushan National Geopark
Dabieshan (Lu'an) National Geopark 
Chizhou Jiuhuashan National Geopark
Fengyangshan National Geopark
Guangde Taijidong National Geopark
Yashan National Geopark
Lingbi Qingyunshan National Geopark
Fanchang Marenshan Geopark
Shitai Karst Caves Geopark
Fujian
Zhangzhou Littoral Volcanic Landforms National Geopark
Dajinhu National Geopark
Jinjiang Shenhuwan National Geopark
Fuding Taimushan National Geopark
Ninghua Tian'edong Caves National Geopark
Dehua Shiniushan National Geopark
Pingnan Baishuiyang National Geopark
Yong'an National Geopark
Liancheng Guanzhishan National Geopark (locally pronounced Guanzhaishan) 
Baiyunshan National Geopark
Pinghe Lingtongshan National Geopark
Zhenghe Fozishan Geopark
Qingliu Hot Spring National Geopark
Sanming Jiaoye National Geopark
Pingtan Geopark
Ningde Sandu'ao Geopark
Shouning Guantaishan Guyindong National Geopark
Jiangxi
Lushan Quaternary Glaciation National Geopark
Longhushan Danxia Landform National Geopark
Sanqingshan National Geopark
Wugongshan National Geopark
Shicheng National Geopark
Shandong
Shanwang National Geopark
Zaozhuang Xiong'ershan National Geopark (aka “Zaozhuang Xiong'ershan – Baodugu NGP”)
Dongying Huanghe Sanjiaozhou National Geopark
Taishan National Geopark
Yimengshan National Geopark
Changshan Liedao National Geopark
Zhucheng Dinosaur National Geopark
Qingzhou National Geopark
Laiyang Cretaceous National Geopark
Yiyuan Lushan National Geopark
Changle Volcano National Geopark
Wulianshan – Jiuxianshan Geopark, Wulian 
Yishan Geopark, Zoucheng
Henan
Songshan Stratigraphic Structure National Geopark
Jiaozuo Yuntaishan National Geopark 
Neixiang Baotianman National Geopark
Wangwushan National Geopark
Xixia Funiushan National Geopark
Chayashan National Geopark
Zhengzhou Huanghe National Geopark
Guanshan National Geopark
Luoning Shenlingzhai National Geopark
Luoyang Daimeishan National Geopark
Xinyang Jingangtai National Geopark
Xiaoqinling National Geopark
Hongqiqu - Linlüshan National Geopark
Ruyang Dinosaur National Geopark
Yaoshan Geopark
Hubei
Changjiang Sanxia National Geopark (trans-provincial NGP, shared with Chongqing)
Shennongjia National Geopark
Wuhan Mulanshan National Geopark
Yunxian Dinosaur-egg Fossil Coenosis National Geopark
Wudangshan National Geopark
Huanggang Dabieshan National Geopark
Wufeng National Geopark
Xianning Jiugongshan – Wenquan Geopark
Enshi Tenglongdong Daxiagu National Geopark
Changyang Qingjiang National Geopark
Yuan'an Fossil Coenosis Geopark
Hunan
Zhangjiajie National Geopark
Chenzhou Feitianshan National Geopark
Langshan National Geopark
Fenghuang National Geopark
Guzhang Hongshilin National Geopark (Hongshilin: “Red Stone Forest”, formed by red carbonate rocks)
Jiubujiang National Geopark
Wulongshan National Geopark
Meijiang National Geopark
Pingjiang Shiniuzhai National Geopark
Liuyang Daweishan National Geopark
Tongdao Wanfoshan National Geopark
Anhua Xuefenghu Geopark
Yizhang Mangshan Geopark
Xinshao Baishuidong Geopark
Guangdong
Danxiashan National Geopark
Zhanjiang Huguangyan National Geopark
Foshan Xiqiaoshan National Geopark
Yangchun Lingxiaoyan National Geopark
Shenzhen Dapeng Bandao National Geopark
Fengkai National Geopark
Enping Geotherm National Geopark
Yangshan National Geopark
Raoping Qinglan Geopark
Guangxi
Ziyuan National Geopark
Bose Leye Dashiwei Karst Tiankeng Group National Geopark
Beihai Weizhoudao Volcano National Geopark
Fengshan Karst National Geopark
Luzhai Xiangqiao Karst National Geopark
Dahua Qibailong National Geopark
Guiping National Geopark
Yizhou “Stone Forest above the Water” Geopark (qualification cancelled on December 9, 2016)
Pubei Wuhuangshan National Geopark
Du'an Subterranean River National Geopark
Luocheng National Geopark
Donglan Geopark
Hainan
Haikou Shishan Volcano Group National Geopark
Baisha Geopark
Shilu National Geopark
Chongqing
Changjiang Sanxia National Geopark (trans-provincial NGP, shared with Hubei)
Wulong Karst National Geopark
Qianjiang Xiaonanhai National Geopark
Yunyang Longgang National Geopark (Longgang: literally mean Dragon Vat, a karst tiankeng)
Wansheng National Geopark
Qijiang National Geopark
Shizhu Qiyaoshan Geopark
Youyang Geopark
Yunyang Dinosaur Geopark
Sichuan
Zigong Dinosaur & Paleo-organism National Geopark
Longmenshan Tectonics National Geopark
Hailuogou National Geopark
Daduhe Xiagu National Geopark
Anxian Bioherm National Geopark
Jiuzhaigou National Geopark
Huanglong National Geopark
Xingwen Shihai National Geopark (Shihai: literally mean Sea of Stone, a block field)
Shehong Petrified Wood National Geopark
Siguniangshan National Geopark
Huayingshan National Geopark
Jiangyou National Geopark
Dabashan National Geopark
Guangwushan - Nuoshuihe National Geopark
Qingchuan Earthquake Relics National Geopark
Mianzhu Qingping – Hanwang Geopark
Yanbian Gesala Geopark 
Dagu Bingshan Geopark
Pingshan Ring-scarped Danxia Geopark
Guizhou
Guanling Fossil Coenosis National Geopark
Xingyi National Geopark
Zhijindong National Geopark
Suiyang Shuanghedong National Geopark
Liupanshui Wumengshan National Geopark
Pingtang National Geopark
Qiandongnan Miaoling National Geopark
Sinan Wujiang Karst National Geopark
Chishui Danxia National Geopark
Ziyun Getuhe Geopark
Yunnan
Shilin Pinnacle Karst National Geopark 
Chengjiang Fauna & Paleo-organism National Geopark
Tengchong Volcano National Geopark (aka “Tengchong Volcano and Geotherm NGP”)
Lufeng Dinosaur National Geopark
Yulong Liming - Laojunshan National Geopark
Dali Cangshan National Geopark
Lijiang Yulong Xueshan Glacier National Geopark
Jiuxiang Canyon and Cavern National Geopark
Luoping Biota National Geopark
Luxi Alu National Geopark
Dongchuan Debris Flow Geopark
Weishan Hongheyuan Geopark
Tibet
Yi'ong National Geopark
Zanda Earth Forest National Geopark
Yangbajain National Geopark
Shaanxi
Cuihuashan Mountain Rockslide Geohazard National Geopark
Huanghe Hukou Pubu National Geopark (trans-provincial NGP, shared with Shanxi)
Luochuan Loess National Geopark
Yanchuan Yellow River Meander National Geopark
Shangnan Jinsixia National Geopark
Langao Nangongshan National Geopark
Zhashui Karst Cave National Geopark
Yaozhou Zhaojin Danxia Geopark
Hanzhong Liping National Geopark
Huashan Geopark
Gansu
Dunhuang Yardang National Geopark
Liujiaxia Dinosaur National Geopark
Pingliang Kongtongshan National Geopark
Jingtai Huanghe Shilin National Geopark (Huanghe Shilin: "Yellow River Stone Forest")
Hezheng Paleo-organism Fossils National Geopark
Tianshui Maijishan National Geopark
Zhangye National Geopark
Bingling Danxia Geopark
Tanchang Guan'egou Geopark 
Lintan Yeliguan Geopark
Pingshanhu Geopark, Ganzhou, Zhangye
Têwo Zhagana Geopark
Qinghai
Jainca Kamra National Geopark
Jigzhi Nyainboyuzê National Geopark
Golmud Kunlunshan National Geopark
Huzhu Jiading National Geopark
Guide National Geopark
Qinghaihu Geopark
Maqên A'nyêmaqên Shan National Geopark
Tongde Shizang Danxia Geopark
Ningxia
Xiji Huoshizhai National Geopark
Lingwu Geopark (qualification cancelled on December 9, 2016)
Xinjiang
Burqin Kanas Hu National Geopark
Qitai Petrified Wood-Dinosaur National Geopark
Fuyun Koktokay National Geopark
Tianshan Tianchi National Geopark
Kuqa Grand Canyon National Geopark
Turpan Huoyanshan Geopark
Wensu Salt Dome Geopark
Jeminay Caoyuanshicheng Geopark
Hami Pterosaur-Yardang Geopark
Burqin Geopark
Hong Kong
Hong Kong National Geopark

†: From May 23, 2009, onwards, the approval process for awarding the NGP qualifications and naming the NGPs are treated separately by the State Forestry and Grassland Administration. Each NGP-prequalified unit is required to complete a site development within the three-year time limit before gaining formal status as a NGP.

National Mining Parks of China (disbanded)
Number of NMPs (unit): 0 (87 before July 24, 2019)
Note: The former NMPs would either be incorporated into existing protected areas or redesignated as other categories of national-level nature parks.  The work is still in progress.

National Ecoparks of China
Ratified by: State Forestry Administration
Number of NEPs (unit): 18 (as at January 24, 2017)
Area of NEPs (10,000 ha): TBV
Hebei
Weichang Hulstai National Ecopark
Inner Mongolia
Hondlon National Ecopark
Ordos National Ecopark
Zhuozi Hongshiya National Ecopark
Jiangsu
Zhangjiagang Jiyanghu National Ecopark
Yancheng Longgang National Ecopark
Zhejiang
Kaihua, National Ecopark of the East
Anhui
Feixi Guanting National Ecopark
Shandong
Gaotang Qingping National Ecopark
Zaozhuang Huancheng National Ecopark
Henan
Qingfeng Yangzi National Ecopark
Nanle Huanghe Gudao National Ecopark
Minquan Huanghe Gudao National Ecopark
Hubei
Suizhou Suichengshan National Ecopark
Baokang Yaozhihe National Ecopark
Chongqing
Nanchuan Shanwangping Karst National Ecopark
Guizhou
Daozhen Luolong National Ecopark
Qinghai
Xining Huancheng National Ecopark

National Forest Parks of China
Ratified by: State Forestry and Grassland Administration
Number of NFPs (unit): 906 (excl. 8 delisted sites, as at December 11, 2020), plus one national forest resort (as at July 6, 1994)
Area of NFPs + NFR (10,000 ha): 1441.05
Total Number of FPs & NFR (unit): 3,505
Area of FPs + NFR (10,000 ha): 2028.19
Beijing
Xishan National Forest Park
Shangfangshan National Forest Park
Shisanling National Forest Park
Yunmengshan National Forest Park
Xiaolongmen National Forest Park
Jiufeng National Forest Park
Daxing Ancient Mulberry National Forest Park
Dayangshan National Forest Park
Xiayunling National Forest Park
Huangsongyu National Forest Park
Beigong National Forest Park
Badaling National Forest Park
Qifengshan National Forest Park
Tianmenshan National Forest Park
Labagoumen National Forest Park
Tianjin
Jiulongshan National Forest Park
Hebei
Haibin National Forest Park
Saihanba National Forest Park
Qingchuifeng National Forest Park
Xiangyundao National Forest Park
Shifo National Forest Park (revoked on December 29, 2015)
Qingdongling National Forest Park
Liaoheyuan National Forest Park
Shanhaiguan National Forest Park
Wuyuezhai National Forest Park
Baicaowa National Forest Park
Tianshengqiao National Forest Park
Huangyangshan National Forest Park
Maojingba National Forest Park
Xiangtangshan National Forest Park
Yesanpo National Forest Park
Liuliping National Forest Park
Gubeiyue National Forest Park
Baishishan National Forest Park
Wu'an National Forest Park
Yizhou National Forest Park
Qiannanyu National Forest Park
Tuoliangshan National Forest Park
Mulan Weichang National Forest Park
Xiezigou National Forest Park
Xiantaishan National Forest Park
Fengning National Forest Park
Heilongshan National Forest Park
Chengde Shihai National Forest Park (revoked on August 20, 2010)
Daqingshan National Forest Park
Huailai National Forest Park
Bashang Guyuan National Forest Park
Shanxi
Wutaishan National Forest Park
Tianlongshan National Forest Park
Guandishan National Forest Park
Guancenshan National Forest Park
Hengshan National Forest Park
Yungang National Forest Park
Longquan National Forest Park
Yuwangdong National Forest Park
Zhaogaoguan National Forest Park
Fangshan National Forest Park
Jiaochengshan National Forest Park
Taiyueshan National Forest Park
Wulaofeng National Forest Park
Laodingshan National Forest Park
Wujinshan National Forest Park
Zhongtiaoshan National Forest Park
Huangyadong National Forest Park
Taihang Xiagu National Forest Park
Qizishan National Forest Park
Taihang Honggu National Forest Park
Anze National Forest Park 
Xiantangshan National Forest Park
Erlangshan National Forest Park
Xikou Gudao National Forest Park
Putishan National Forest Park
Inner Mongolia
Hongshan National Forest Park
Qarsan National Forest Park
Hadamen National Forest Park
Hailar National Forest Park
Ul Shan National Forest Park
Ust National Forest Park
Ma'anshan National Forest Park
Ulastai National Forest Park
Xinglong National Forest Park
Arxan National Forest Park
Darbin Hu National Forest Park
Huanggangliang National Forest Park
Mordaga National Forest Park
Yikesama National Forest Park
Helanshan National Forest Park
Hoson Gou National Forest Park
Ejin Diversifolius Poplar National Forest Park
Wangyedian National Forest Park
Huamugou National Forest Park
Orqohan National Forest Park
Hinggan National Forest Park
Chaoyuan National Forest Park
Alihe National Forest Park
Wudang Ju National Forest Park
Honggolj Mongolian Scots Pine National Forest Park
Lamashan National Forest Park
Luanheyuan National Forest Park
Hetao National Forest Park
Bogd Ul National Forest Park
Longsheng National Forest Park
Cilechuan National Forest Park
Qinggis Han National Forest Park
Chaor Daxiagu National Forest Park
Tubl National Forest Park 
Shenshan National Forest Park 
Olon National Forest Park
Liaoning
Lüshunkou National Forest Park
Haitangshan National Forest Park
Dagushan National Forest Park
Shoushan National Forest Park
Fenghuangshan National Forest Park
Huanren National Forest Park
Benxi National Forest Park
Yunshishan National Forest Park
Tianqiaogou National Forest Park (revoked on July 16, 2009)
Gaizhou National Forest Park
Yuanshuailin National Forest Park
Xianrendong National Forest Park
Dalian Daheshan National Forest Park
Changshan Qundao National Sea-island Forest Park
Pulandian National Forest Park
Daheishan National Forest Park
Shenyang National Forest Park
Jinlongsi National Forest Park
Benxi Huancheng National Forest Park
Binglashan National Forest Park
Houshi National Forest Park　
Qianshan Xianrentai National Forest Park
Qingyuan Honghegu National Forest Park
Dalian Tianmenshan National Forest Park
Sankuaishi National Forest Park
Zhanggutai Sandland National Forest Park
Dalian Yinshitan National Forest Park
Dalian Xijiao National Forest Park
Yiwulüshan National Forest Park
Hemu National Forest Park
Suizhong Changcheng National Forest Park
Wafangdian National Forest Park 
Tieling Qilinhu National Forest Park
Jilin
Jingyuetan National Forest Park
Wunüfeng National Forest Park
Longwan Crater Lakes National Forest Park
Baijifeng National Forest Park
Mao'ershan National Forest Park
Banlashan National Forest Park
Sanxianjia National Forest Park
Da'an National Forest Park
Changbai National Forest Park
Linjiang National Forest Park
Lafashan National Forest Park
Tumenjiang National Forest Park
Zhuqueshan National Forest Park
Tumenjiangyuan National Forest Park
Yanbian Xianfeng National Forest Park
Guanma Lianhuashan National Forest Park
Zhaodajishan National Forest Park
Hancongding National Forest Park
Mantianxing National Forest Park
Diaoshuihu National Forest Park
Lushuihe National Forest Park
Tonghua Shihu National Forest Park
Hongshi National Forest Park
Jiangyuan National Forest Park
Jiguanshan National Forest Park
Quanyangquan National Forest Park
Baishishan National Forest Park
Songjianghe National Forest Park
Sanchazi National Forest Park
Linjiang Cascades National Forest Park
Wangou National Forest Park
Lanjia Daxiagu National Forest Park
Changbaishan Beipo National Forest Park
Hongyeling National Forest Park
Longshanhu National Forest Park

Baishan City National Forest Resort
Heilongjiang
Mudanfeng National Forest Park
Huoshankou National Forest Park
Daliangzihe National Forest Park
Wulong National Forest Park
Harbin National Forest Park
Jiejinshan National Forest Park
Qiqihar National Forest Park
Beijicun National Forest Park
Changshou National Forest Park
Daqing National Forest Park
Weihushan National Forest Park
Wuying National Forest Park
Yabuli National Forest Park
Yimianpo National Forest Park
Longfeng National Forest Park
Jinquan National Forest Park
Wusulijiang National Forest Park
Taoshan National Forest Park
Yimashan National Forest Park
Sandaoguan National Forest Park
Suifenhe National Forest Park
Riyuexia National Forest Park
Xinglong National Forest Park
Wumahe National Forest Park
Fenghuangshan National Forest Park
Xuexiang National Forest Park
Baliwan National Forest Park
Wudingshan National Forest Park
Longjiang Sanxia National Forest Park
Maolangou National Forest Park
Hegang National Forest Park
Qingshan National Forest Park
Dazhanhe National Forest Park
Huilongwan National Forest Park
Danqinghe National Forest Park
Shilongshan National Forest Park
Boli Wusihunhe National Forest Park
Xishui National Forest Park
Fangzheng Longshan National Forest Park
Jingpohu National Forest Park
Jinshan National Forest Park
Jiapigou National Forest Park
Xiao Hinggan Ling Shilin National Forest Park
Liufengshan National Forest Park
Wanglongshan National Forest Park
Shengshan Yaosai National Forest Park
Wudalianchi National Forest Park　
Wandashan National Forest Park
Zhenbaodao National Forest Park
Yichun Hinggan National Forest Park
Huzhong National Forest Park
Hongsonglin National Forest Park
Qixingfeng National Forest Park
Jinlongshan National Forest Park
Xianwengshan National Forest Park
Jagdaqi National Forest Park
Hulan National Forest Park
Changshoushan National Forest Park
Huachuan National Forest Park
Shuangzishan National Forest Park
Xianglushan National Forest Park
Daqingguan National Forest Park
Xiao Hinggan Ling Korean Pine National Forest Park
Huaxiadongji National Forest Park
Shendongshan National Forest Park
Qixingshan National Forest Park 
Dale National Forest Park
Nianzishan National Forest Park
Zhalinkur National Forest Park
Tianshi National Forest Park
Hailun National Forest Park
Shanghai
Sheshan National Forest Park
Dongping National Forest Park
Shanghai Haiwan National Forest Park
Shanghai Gongqing National Forest Park
Jiangsu
Yushan National Forest Park
Shangfangshan National Forest Park
Xuzhou Huancheng National Forest Park
Yixing National Forest Park
Huishan National Forest Park
Dongwu National Forest Park
Yuntaishan National Forest Park
Xuyi Diyishan National Forest Park
Nanshan National Forest Park
Baohuashan National Forest Park
Xishan National Forest Park
Nanjing Zijinshan National Forest Park
Tieshansi National Forest Park
Dayangshan National Forest Park
Nanjing Qixiashan National Forest Park
Nanjing Laoshan National Forest Park
Tianmuhu National Forest Park
Nanjing Wuxiangshan National Forest Park
Huanghai Haibin National Forest Park
Santaishan National Forest Park
Nantong Langshan National Forest Park
Zhejiang
Qiandaohu National Forest Park
Daqishan National Forest Park
Lanting National Forest Park
Wuchaoshan National Forest Park
Fuchunjiang National Forest Park
Zhuxiang National Forest Park
Tiantong National Forest Park
Yandangshan National Forest Park
Xikou National Forest Park
Jiulongshan National Forest Park
Shuanglongdong National Forest Park
Huading National Forest Park
Qingshanhu National Forest Park
Yucangshan National Forest Park
Qianjiangyuan National Forest Park
Ziweishan National Forest Park
Tonglingshan National Forest Park
Huayan National Forest Park
Longwantan National Forest Park
Suichang National Forest Park
Wuxie National Forest Park
Shuangfeng National Forest Park
Shimendong National Forest Park
Simingshan National Forest Park
Xianxia National Forest Park
Daxi National Forest Park
Songyang Maoshan National Forest Park
Niutoushan National Forest Park
Sanqu National Forest Park
Jingshan (Shangougou) National Forest Park
Nanshanhu National Forest Park
Dazhuhai National Forest Park
Xianju National Forest Park
Tonglu Yaolin National Forest Park
Zhuji Grand Torreya National Forest Park
Hangzhou Banshan National Forest Park
Qingyuan National Forest Park
Youzishan National Forest Park
Hangzhou Xishan National Forest Park
Liangxi National Forest Park
Lishui Baiyun National Forest Park
Kuocangshan National Forest Park
Shaoxing Kuaijishan National Forest Park
Shexiang Caoyutang National Forest Park
Dongyang Nanshan National Forest Park
Anhui
Huangshan National Forest Park
Langyashan National Forest Park
Tianzhushan National Forest Park
Jiuhuashan National Forest Park
Huangcangyu National Forest Park
Huizhou National Forest Park
Dalongshan National Forest Park
Zipengshan National Forest Park
Huangfushan National Forest Park
Tiantangzhai National Forest Park
Jilongshan National Forest Park
Yefushan National Forest Park
Taihushan National Forest Park
Shenshan National Forest Park
Miaodaoshan National Forest Park
Tianjingshan National Forest Park
Shungengshan National Forest Park
Fushan National Forest Park
Shiliandong National Forest Park
Qiyunshan National Forest Park
Jiushan National Forest Park
Hengshan National Forest Park
Jingtingshan National Forest Park
Bagongshan National Forest Park
Wanfoshan National Forest Park
Qinglongwan National Forest Park
Shuixi National Forest Park
Shangyao National Forest Park
Marenshan National Forest Park
Hefei Dashushan National Forest Park
Hefei Binhu National Forest Park
Tachuan National Forest Park
Laojiashan National Forest Park 
Majiaxi National Forest Park 
Xiangshan National Forest Park
Fujian
Fuzhou National Forest Park
Tianzhushan National Forest Park
Pingtan Haidao National Forest Park
Hua'an National Forest Park
Mao'ershan National Forest Park
Longyan National Forest Park
Qishan National Forest Park
Sanyuan National Forest Park
Lingshishan National Forest Park
Dongshan National Forest Park
Jiangle Tianjieshan National Forest Park
Dehua Shiniushan National Forest Park
Xiamen Lianhua National Forest Park
Sanming Xianrengu National Forest Park
Shanghang National Forest Park
Wuyishan National Forest Park
Wushan National Forest Park
Zhangping Tiantai National Forest Park
Wangshoushan National Forest Park
Jiulonggu National Forest Park
Zhitishan National Forest Park
Tianxingshan National Forest Park
Minjiangyuan National Forest Park
Jiulong Zhuhai National Forest Park
Changle National Forest Park
Kuangshan National Forest Park
Longhushan National Forest Park (revoked on December 29, 2015)
Nanjing Tulou National Forest Park
Wuyi Tianchi National Forest Park
Wuhushan National Forest Park
Yangmeizhou Xiagu National Forest Park
Jiangxi
Sanzhualun National Forest Park
Lushan Shannan National Forest Park
Meiling National Forest Park
Sanbaishan National Forest Park
Mazushan National Forest Park
Poyanghukou National Forest Park
Lingyandong National Forest Park
Mingyueshan National Forest Park
Cuiweifeng National Forest Park
Tianzhufeng National Forest Park
Taihe National Forest Park
Ehushan National Forest Park
Guifeng National Forest Park
Shangqing National Forest Park
Meiguan National Forest Park
Yongfeng National Forest Park
Gezaoshan National Forest Park
Sandiequan National Forest Park
Wugongshan National Forest Park
Tongboshan National Forest Park
Yangmingshan National Forest Park
Tianhuajing National Forest Park
Wuzhifeng National Forest Park
Zhelinhu National Forest Park
Ganzhou Yangminghu National Forest Park
Wan'an National Forest Park
Sanwan National Forest Park
Anyuan National Forest Park
Jiulianshan National Forest Park
Yanquan National Forest Park
Yunbifeng National Forest Park
Jingdezhen National Forest Park
Yaoli National Forest Park
Fengshan National Forest Park
Qingliangshan National Forest Park
Jiulingshan National Forest Park
Censhan National Forest Park
Wufushan National Forest Park
Junfengshan National Forest Park
Bihutan National Forest Park
Huaiyushan National Forest Park
Yangtiangang National Forest Park
Shengshuitang National Forest Park
Poyang Lianhuashan National Forest Park
Pengze National Forest Park
Jinpenshan National Forest Park
Guixi National Forest Park
Huichangshan National Forest Park 
Luoxiaoshan Daxiagu National Forest Park 
Hongyan National Forest Park
Shandong
Laoshan National Forest Park
Baodugu National Forest Park
Huanghekou National Forest Park
Kunyushan National Forest Park
Luoshan National Forest Park
Changdao National Forest Park
Yishan National Forest Park
Nishan National Forest Park
Taishan National Forest Park
Culaishan National Forest Park
Rizhao Haibin National Forest Park
Hebanshan National Forest Park
Menglianggu National Forest Park
Liubu National Forest Park
Liugongdao National Forest Park
Chashan National Forest Park
Yaoxiang National Forest Park
Yuanshan National Forest Park
Lingshanwan National Forest Park
Shuangdao National Forest Park
Mengshan National Forest Park
Lashan National Forest Park
Yangtianshan National Forest Park
Weideshan National Forest Park
Zhushan National Forest Park
Juyushan National Forest Park
Niushan National Forest Park
Lushan National Forest Park
Wulianshan National Forest Park
Laiwu Huashan National Forest Park
Aishan National Forest Park
Longkou Nanshan National Forest Park
Xintai Lianhuashan National Forest Park
Zhaohushan National Forest Park
Yashan National Forest Park
Shouyangshan National Forest Park
Dong'e Huanghe National Forest Park
Ezhuang Ancient Village National Forest Park
Yishan National Forest Park
Tengzhou Mozi National Forest Park
Mizhou National Forest Park
Liushan Paleovolcano National Forest Park
Quanlin National Forest Park
Zhangqiu National Forest Park
Yicheng Ancient Pomegranate National Forest Park
Qishanyouxia National Forest Park
Xiajin Huanghe Gudao National Forest Park
Chiping National Forest Park
Panlongshan National Forest Park
Henan
Songshan National Forest Park
Sishan National Forest Park
Ruzhou National Forest Park
Shimantan National Forest Park
Boshan National Forest Park
Kaifeng National Forest Park
Yawushan National Forest Park
Huaguoshan National Forest Park
Yuntaishan National Forest Park
Baiyunshan National Forest Park
Longyuwan National Forest Park
Wulongdong National Forest Park
Nanwan National Forest Park
Ganshan National Forest Park
Huaiheyuan National Forest Park
Shenlingzhai National Forest Park
Tongshanhu National Forest Park
Huanghe Gudao National Forest Park
Yushan National Forest Park
Jinlanshan National Forest Park
Yuhuangshan National Forest Park
Chayashan National Forest Park　
Tianchishan National Forest Park
Shizushan National Forest Park
Huangbaishan National Forest Park
Yanzishan National Forest Park
Tangxiyuan National Forest Park
Dahongzhai National Forest Park
Tianmushan National Forest Park, Xinyang
Dasushan National Forest Park
Yunmengshan National Forest Park
Jindingshan National Forest Park
Songding National Forest Park
Hubei
Jiufeng National Forest Park
Lumensi National Forest Park
Yuquansi National Forest Park
Dalaoling National Forest Park
Shennongjia National Forest Park
Longmenhe National Forest Park
Xieshan National Forest Park
Dakou National Forest Park
Qingjiang National Forest Park
Dabieshan National Forest Park
Chaibuxi National Forest Park
Qianshan National Forest Park
Balingshan National Forest Park
Weishui National Forest Park
Taizishan National Forest Park
Sanjiaoshan National Forest Park
Zhonghuashan National Forest Park
Hong'an Tiantaishan National Forest Park
Pingbaying National Forest Park
Wujiashan National Forest Park
Shuangfengshan National Forest Park
Qianfodong National Forest Park
Dahongshan National Forest Park
Huzhuashan National Forest Park
Wu'naoshan National Forest Park
Canglangshan National Forest Park
Anlu Ancient Gingko National Forest Park
Niutoushan National Forest Park
Sijingyuan National Forest Park
Jiunüfeng National Forest Park
Piantoushan National Forest Park
Danjiangkou National Forest Park
Chongyang National Forest Park
Hanjiang Waterfalls National Forest Park
Xisaiguo National Forest Park
Xianshan National Forest Park
Baizhuyuansi National Forest Park
Badong National Forest Park
Hunan
Zhangjiajie National Forest Park
Shennonggu National Forest Park
Mangshan National Forest Park
Daweishan National Forest Park
Yunshan National Forest Park
Jiuyishan National Forest Park
Yangmingshan National Forest Park
Nanhuashan National Forest Park
Huangshantou National Forest Park
Taohuayuan National Forest Park
Tianmenshan National Forest Park
Tianjiling National Forest Park
Tian'eshan National Forest Park
Shunhuangshan National Forest Park, Dong'an 
Dongtaishan National Forest Park
Jiashansi National Forest Park
Bu'ermen National Forest Park
Hefu National Forest Park
Gouloufeng National Forest Park
Dayunshan National Forest Park
Huayanxi National Forest Park
Daxiongshan National Forest Park
Zhongpo National Forest Park
Yunyang National Forest Park
Jindong National Forest Park
Mufushan National Forest Park
Baili Longshan National Forest Park
Qianjiadong National Forest Park
Liangjiang Xiagu National Forest Park
Xuefengshan National Forest Park
Wujianshan National Forest Park
Taohuajiang National Forest Park
Xiangjiangyuan National Forest Park
Yueyan National Forest Park
Fengluanxi National Forest Park
Zhexi National Forest Park
Tiantangshan National Forest Park
Ningxiang Xiangshan National Forest Park
Jiulongjiang National Forest Park
Songyunshan National Forest Park
Tianquanshan National Forest Park
Xiyao Lügu National Forest Park
Qingyanghu National Forest Park (revoked on April 10, 2018)
Xiongfengshan National Forest Park
Nuoxi National Forest Park
Fuyinshan National Forest Park
Zuolongxia National Forest Park
Changsha Heimifeng National Forest Park
Youzhou National Forest Park
Aizhai National Forest Park
Jiashan National Forest Park
Yongxing Danxia National Forest Park
Qiyunfeng National Forest Park
Simingshan National Forest Park
Beiluoxiao National Forest Park
Jingzhou National Forest Park
Jiahe National Forest Park
Yuanling National Forest Park
Xupu National Forest Park
Hanshou Zhuhai National Forest Park
Xuanzhou National Forest Park
Qishan National Forest Park
Taibaifeng National Forest Park 
Tengyunling National Forest Park
Guangdong
Wutongshan National Forest Park
Wanyou National Forest Park (revoked on November 9, 2010)
Xiaokeng National Forest Park
Nan'ao Haidao National Forest Park
Nanling National Forest Park
Xinfengjiang National Forest Park
Shaoguan National Forest Park
Donghaidao National Forest Park (revoked on December 29, 2015)
Liuxihe National Forest Park
Nankunshan National Forest Park
Xiqiaoshan National Forest Park
Shimen National Forest Park
Guifengshan National Forest Park
Yingde National Forest Park
Guangning Zhuhai National Forest Park
Beifengshan National Forest Park
Daiwangshan National Forest Park　
Shenguangshan National Forest Park
Guanyinshan National Forest Park
Lianghua National Forest Park
Sanlingshan National Forest Park
Yanminghu National Forest Park
Tianjingshan National Forest Park
Dabeishan National Forest Park
Zhenshan National Forest Park
Nantaishan National Forest Park
Kanghe Wenquan National Forest Park
Yinnashan National Forest Park
Zhongshan National Forest Park 
Yunyong National Forest Park
Guangxi
Guilin National Forest Park
Liangfengjiang National Forest Park
Sanmenjiang National Forest Park
Longtan National Forest Park
Daguishan National Forest Park
Yuanbaoshan National Forest Park
Bajiaozhai National Forest Park
Shiwandashan National Forest Park
Longsheng Wenquan National Forest Park
Guposhan National Forest Park
Dayaoshan National Forest Park
Huangjingdong Tiankeng National Forest Park
Feilonghu National Forest Park
Taiping Shishan National Forest Park
Darongshan National Forest Park
Yangshuo National Forest Park
Jiulong Cascades National Forest Park
Pingtianshan National Forest Park
Hongchagou National Forest Park
Longtan Daxiagu National Forest Park
Shizishan National Forest Park 
Longxiashan National Forest Park 
Fengshan Gendan National Forest Park
Hainan
Jianfengling National Forest Park
Lanyang Wenquan National Forest Park
Diaoluoshan National Forest Park
Haikou Huoshan National Forest Park
Qixianling Wenquan National Forest Park
Limushan National Forest Park
Haishang National Forest Park
Bawangling National Forest Park
Xinglong Qiaoxiang National Forest Park
Chongqing
Shuangguishan National Forest Park
Xiaosanxia National Forest Park
Jinfoshan National Forest Park
Huangshui National Forest Park
Xiannüshan National Forest Park
Maoyunshan National Forest Park
Wulingshan National Forest Park
Qinglonghu National Forest Park
Qianjiang National Forest Park
Liangping Dongshan National Forest Park
Qiaokouba National Forest Park
Tiefengshan National Forest Park
Hongchiba National Forest Park
Xuebaoshan National Forest Park
Yulongshan National Forest Park
Heishan National Forest Park
Geleshan National Forest Park
Chashan Zhuhai National Forest Park
Jiuchongshan National Forest Park
Dayuandong National Forest Park
Chongqing Nanshan National Forest Park
Guanyinxia National Forest Park
Tianchishan National Forest Park
Youyang Taohuayuan National Forest Park
Bargai National Forest Park
Yuqingshan National Forest Park
Sichuan
Dujiangyan National Forest Park
Jianmenguan National Forest Park
Wawushan National Forest Park
Gaoshan National Forest Park
Xiling National Forest Park
Ertan National Forest Park
Hailuogou National Forest Park
Qiqushan National Forest Park
Jiuzhai National Forest Park
Tiantaishan National Forest Park
Fubao National Forest Park
Heizhugou National Forest Park
Jiajinshan National Forest Park
Longcanggou National Forest Park
Meinüfeng National Forest Park
Longmenshan National Forest Park
Huayingshan National Forest Park
Wufengshan National Forest Park
Qianfoshan National Forest Park
Copu National Forest Park
Micangshan National Forest Park
Erlangshan National Forest Park
Tianzhaoshan National Forest Park
Zhenlongshan National Forest Park
Yaksha National Forest Park
Tianmashan National Forest Park
Kongshan National Forest Park
Yunhu National Forest Park
Tieshan National Forest Park
Hehuahai National Forest Park
Lingyunshan National Forest Park
Beichuan National Forest Park
Langzhong National Forest Park
Xuanhan National Forest Park
Cangxi National Forest Park
Muchuan National Forest Park
Jiguanshan National Forest Park
Xianshuihe Daxiagu National Forest Park
Shalulishan National Forest Park
Jinchuan National Forest Park
Huangjinglaolin National Forest Park
Peng'an National Forest Park
Taipengshan National Forest Park
Congrengu National Forest Park
Guizhou
Baili Dujuan National Forest Park
Zhuhai National Forest Park
Jiulongshan National Forest Park
Fenghuangshan National Forest Park
Changpoling National Forest Park
Yaorenshan National Forest Park
Yanziyan National Forest Park
Yushe National Forest Park
Leigongshan National Forest Park
Xishui National Forest Park
Liping National Forest Park
Zhujiashan National Forest Park
Zilinshan National Forest Park
Wuyanghu National Forest Park
Hezhang Yelang National Forest Park
Xianheping National Forest Park
Qingyunhu National Forest Park
Bijie National Forest Park
Dabanshui National Forest Park
Longjiashan National Forest Park
Jiudaoshui National Forest Park
Taijiang National Forest Park
Ganxi National Forest Park
Youshanhe Daxiagu National Forest Park
Huangguoshupubuyuan National Forest Park
Yang'asha National Forest Park
Fuquan National Forest Park
Jinsha Lengshuihe National Forest Park
Yunnan
Weibaoshan National Forest Park
Tianxing National Forest Park
Qinghuadong National Forest Park
Dongshan National Forest Park
Laifengshan National Forest Park
Huayudong National Forest Park
Mopanshan National Forest Park
Longquan National Forest Park
Taiyanghe National Forest Park
Jindian National Forest Park
Zhangfeng National Forest Park
Shibalianshan National Forest Park
Lubuge National Forest Park
Zhujiangyuan National Forest Park
Wufengshan National Forest Park
Zhonglingshan National Forest Park
Qipanshan National Forest Park
Lingbaoshan National Forest Park
Xiaobailong National Forest Park (revoked on March 9, 2015)
Wulaoshan National Forest Park
Tongluoba National Forest Park
Zijinshan National Forest Park
Feilaisi National Forest Park
Guishan National Forest Park
Xinshengqiao National Forest Park
Xishuangbanna National Forest Park
Baotaishan National Forest Park
Shuangjiang Ancient Tea Hill National Forest Park
Lancang National Forest Park
Yongren Jinshajiang National Forest Park
Bojijin National Forest Park
Mojiang National Forest Park 
Guanyinshan National Forest Park 
Yunlong National Forest Park
Tibet
Pagsum Hu National Forest Park
Sêrkyimla National Forest Park
Kangrinboqê National Forest Park
Banggong Hu National Forest Park
Ra'og Hu National Forest Park
Razhêng National Forest Park
Jêdêxoi National Forest Park
Nyêmo National Forest Park
Biri Shenshan National Forest Park
Shaanxi
Taibaishan National Forest Park
Yan'an National Forest Park
Louguantai National Forest Park
Zhongnanshan National Forest Park
Jialingjiangyuan National Forest Park
Tianhuashan National Forest Park
Zhuque National Forest Park
Nangongshan National Forest Park
Wangshunshan National Forest Park
Wulongdong National Forest Park
Lishan National Forest Park
Hanzhong Tiantai National Forest Park
Jinsi Daxiagu National Forest Park
Tongtianhe National Forest Park
Liping National Forest Park
Muwang National Forest Park
Yulin Shamo National Forest Park
Laoshan National Forest Park
Taiping National Forest Park
Guiguling National Forest Park
Yuhuagong National Forest Park
Qianjiaping National Forest Park
Mangtoushan National Forest Park
Shangbahe National Forest Park
Heihe National Forest Park
Hongqingshan National Forest Park
Niubeiliang National Forest Park
Tianzhushan National Forest Park
Zibaishan National Forest Park
Shaohuashan National Forest Park
Shimenshan National Forest Park
Huangling National Forest Park
Qingfengxia National Forest Park
Huanglongshan National Forest Park
Hanyin Fenghuangshan National Forest Park
Ziwuling National Forest Park
Wudishan National Forest Park
Gansu
Tulugou National Forest Park
Shifogou National Forest Park
Songmingyan National Forest Park
Yunyasi National Forest Park
Xujiashan National Forest Park
Guiqingshan National Forest Park
Maiji National Forest Park
Jifengshan National Forest Park
Weiheyuan National Forest Park
Tianzhu Sanxia National Forest Park
Yeliguan National Forest Park
Shatan National Forest Park
Guan'egou National Forest Park
Dayu National Forest Park
Lazikou National Forest Park
Wenxian Tianchi National Forest Park
Lianhuashan National Forest Park
Shoulushan National Forest Park
Zhouzuling National Forest Park
Xiaolongshan National Forest Park
Daxiagou National Forest Park
Ziwuling National Forest Park
Qinghai
Kamra National Forest Park
Beishan National Forest Park
Datong National Forest Park
Qunjia National Forest Park
Xianmi National Forest Park
Maixiu National Forest Park
Harhd National Forest Park
Ningxia
Helanshan National Forest Park
Liupanshan National Forest Park
Huamasi National Forest Park
Huoshizhai National Forest Park
Xinjiang
Tianshan Daxiagu National Forest Park
Tianchi National Forest Park
Narat National Forest Park
Künes National Forest Park
Jadeng Yu National Forest Park
Bai Kaba National Forest Park
Tanbula National Forest Park
Janbulag National Forest Park
Kosan Rongdong National Forest Park
Jinhuyang National Forest Park
Gongliu Qaxi National Forest Park
Hami Tianshan National Forest Park
Har Tulag National Forest Park
Usu Foshan National Forest Park
Habahe White Birch National Forest Park
Altai Shan Wenquan National Forest Park
Xat Gudao National Forest Park
Taxihe National Forest Park
Bachu Euphrates Poplar National Forest Park
Ürümqi Tianshan National Forest Park
Jushi Gudao National Forest Park
Baishifeng National Forest Park
Lujiaowan National Forest Park
Guozigou National Forest Park

National Wood (Flower) Parks of China
Ratified by: State Forestry Administration
Number of NW/FPs (unit): 17 (as at January 25, 2018)
Hebei
Xingtang National Red Date Park
Qianxi National Chinese Chestnut Park
Jingxing Canglongshan National Weeping Forsythia Park
Shanxi
Jishan National Chinese Chestnut Park
Jiangsu
Pizhou National Ginkgo Expo Park
Taixing National Ancient Ginkgo Park
Zhejiang
Changshan National Tea-Oil Camellia Park
Anhui
Wuhu Yashan National Peony Park
Huaibei Lieshan National Pomegranate Park
Shandong
Tancheng National Ginkgo Park
Henan
Luoyang National Peony Park
Yanling National Ornamental Plants Expo Park
Xinzheng National Ancient Jujube Grove Park
Sichuan
Jiangyou National Lily Park
Mianzhu National Rose Park
Guizhou
Shuicheng National Azalea Park
Yunnan
Ruili National Noble Dendrobium Park

State Key Parks of China
Ratified by: Ministry of Housing and Urban-Rural Development
Number of SKPs (unit): 63 (as at December 17, 2010)
Total Number of Public Parks (unit): 11,604 (as of 2012)
Area of Public Parks (10,000 ha): 30.6245 (as of 2012)
Beijing
Summer Palace
Tiantan Park
Beihai Park
Beijing Zoo
Beijing Botanical Garden
Zhongshan Park
Jingshan Park
Xiangshan Park
Zizhuyuan Park
Taoranting Park
Hebei
Congtai Park, Handan
Shanxi
Jiangshou Juyuanchi Park, Xinjiang (Jiangshou Juyuanchi:  Site of “Residential Water Garden attached to Jiangzhou Prefecture Office”, Sui dynasty, a provincially protected monument and site)
Beilin Park, Taiyuan (alt. Stele Grove Park)
Liaoning
Dongling Park, Shenyang
Beiling Park, Shenyang
Jilin
Changchun World Sculpture Park
Jiangsu
Humble Administrator's Garden, Suzhou
Lingering Garden, Suzhou
Master of the Nets Garden, Suzhou
Mountain Villa with Embracing Beauty, Suzhou
Lion Grove Garden, Suzhou
Garden of Cultivation, Suzhou
Garden of Couple's Retreat, Suzhou
Retreat and Reflection Garden, Suzhou
Blue Wave Pavilion, Suzhou
Ge Garden, Yangzhou
He Garden, Yangzhou
Huqiu Hill, Suzhou
Shouxihu Park, Yangzhou (Slender West Lake)
Hongmei Park, Changzhou
Xuanwuhu Park, Nanjing (Xuanwu Lake)
Meiyuan Garden, Wuxi
Xihui Park, Wuxi
Jinshan Park, Zhenjiang (Jinshan Hill)
Zhejiang
Fushan Park, Quzhou
Lianhuazhuang Park, Huzhou
Anhui
City Ring Park, Hefei
Fujian
Xiamen Botanical Garden
Xiamen Horticulture Expo Garden
Zhongshan Park, Xiamen
Luoxingta Park, Fuzhou (Luoxing Pagoda)
Donghu Park, Quanzhou (East Lake)
Bailuzhou Park, Xiamen
Jiangxi
Nanhu Park, Jiujiang (South Lake)
Shandong
Baotuquan Park, Jinan
Daming Lake, Jinan
Henan
Bishagang Park, Zhengzhou
Renmin Park, Zhengzhou (alt. People's Park)
Hubei
Zhongshan Park, Wuhan
Huanghelou Park, Wuhan
Jiefang Park, Wuhan (alt. Liberation Park)
Hunan
Hunan Martyr's Park, Changsha
Guangdong
Yuexiu Park, Guangzhou
Xianhu Botanical Garden, Shenzhen
Shenzhen International Garden and Flower Expo Park
Lianhuashan Park  (Lianhua Hill)
Guangxi
Marquis Liu Park, Liuzhou
Longtan Park, Liuzhou
Chongqing
Nanshan Botanical Garden
Eling Park
Chongqing Zoo
Shaanxi
Yan Emperor Garden, Baoji
Ningxia
Zhongshan Park, Yinchuan

National Urban Wetland Parks of China
Ratified by: Ministry of Housing and Urban-Rural Development
Number of NUWPs (unit): 58 (as at January 11, 2017)
Total Number of UWPs (unit): TBV
Beijing
Cuihu National Urban Wetland Park, Haidian
Hebei
Nanhu National Urban Wetland Park, Tangshan
Jumayuan National Urban Wetland Park, Laiyuan, Baoding
Shanxi
Changzhi National Urban Wetland Park
Shengxihu National Urban Wetland Park, Xiaoyi
Inner Mongolia
Ergun National Urban Wetland Park
Liaoning
Lianhuahu National Urban Wetland Park, Tieling
Jilin
Nanhu National Urban Wetland Park, Zhenlai
Heilongjiang
Yuting National Urban Wetland Park, Nehe
Qunli National Urban Wetland Park, Harbin
Wudalianchi Huoshan National Urban Wetland Park
Jiangsu
Changguangxi National Urban Wetland Park, Wuxi
Shanghu National Urban Wetland Park, Changshu
Shajiabang National Urban Wetland Park, Changshu
Lushuiwan National Urban Wetland Park, Nanjing
Kunshan Urban Ecopark
Guchenghu National Urban Wetland Park, Gaochun, Nanjing
Dayangwan National Urban Wetland Park, Yancheng
Zhejiang
Jinghu National Urban Wetland Park, Shaoxing
Sanjiang National Urban Wetland Park, Linhai
Jianyanghu National Urban Wetland Park, Taizhou
Shijiuyang National Urban Wetland Park, Jiaxing
Wuxing Xishanyang National Urban Wetland Park, Huzhou
Anhui
Nanhu National Urban Wetland Park, Huaibei
Shijianhu National Urban Wetland Park, Huainan
Xihu National Urban Wetland Park, Tongling
Fujian
Xinglinwan National Urban Wetland Park, Xiamen
Jiangxi
Kongmujiang National Urban Wetland Park, Xinyu
Shandong
Sanggouwan National Urban Wetland Park, Rongcheng
Mingyuehu National Urban Wetland Park, Dongying
Daotunwa National Urban Wetland Park, Dongping
Binhe National Urban Wetland Park, Linyi
Xiaohai'erkou National Urban Wetland Park, Haiyang
Dawenhe National Urban Wetland Park, Anqiu
Tuhaihe National Urban Wetland Park, Zhanhua
Shuangyuehu National Urban Wetland Park, Linyi
Bailang Lüzhou National Urban Wetland Park, Weifang
Weishui Fengqing National Urban Wetland Park, Changyi
Binhe National Urban Wetland Park, Shouguang
Henan
Tian'ehu National Urban Wetland Park, Sanmenxia
Baihe National Urban Wetland Park, Nanyang
Pingxihu National Urban Wetland Park, Pingdingshan
Bailuzhou National Urban Wetland Park, Pingdingshan
Hubei
Jinyinhu National Urban Wetland Park, Wuhan
Hunan
Xidongtinghu Qingshanhu National Urban Wetland Park, Changde
Guangdong
Lutanghe National Urban Wetland Park, Zhanjiang
Dongguan National Urban Wetland Park
Dayawan Mangrove Forest National Urban Wetland Park, Huizhou
Chongqing
Guanyintang National Urban Wetland Park, Bishan
Sichuan
Langzhong Gucheng National Urban Wetland Park
Bailuwan National Urban Wetland Park, Chengdu
Guizhou
Huaxi National Urban Wetland Park, Guiyang
Hongfenghu - Baihuahu National Urban Wetland Park, Guiyang
Huangguoshu National Urban Wetland park, Anshun
Gansu
Chengbei National Urban Wetland Park, Zhangye
Heihe National Urban Wetland Park, Gaotai, Zhangye
Ningxia
Baohu National Urban Wetland Park, Yinchuan
Xinjiang Production and Construction Corps
Qinggedahu National Urban Wetland Park, Wujiaqu, XPCC Sixth Division

National Wetland Parks of China
Ratified by: State Forestry and Grassland Administration
Number of NWPs (unit): 901 (incl. 494 formally designated sites [*], 5 upgraded sites in accordance with the revised provisions [**/ note 1] & 402 pilot sites; excl. 8 disqualified pilot sites [note 2], as at May 26, 2022)
Area of NWPs (10,000 ha): 36.0 (as of 2008)
Total Number of WPs (unit): TBV
Beijing
Yeyahu National Wetland Park *
Fangshan Changgou Quanshui National Wetland Park *
Tianjin
Wuqing Yongdinghe Gudao National Wetland Park *
Baodi Chaobaihe National Wetland Park *
Jixian Zhouhe National Wetland Park
Xiaying Huanxiuhu National Wetland Park
Hebei
Bashang Shandianhe National Wetland Park *
Beidaihe National Wetland Park *
Fengning Hailiutu National Wetland Park *
Shangyi Qagan Nur National Wetland Park *
Kangbao Kamba Nur National Wetland Park *
Yongnianwa National Wetland Park *
Chongli Qingshuiheyuan National Wetland Park (qualification cancelled on December 22, 2017)
Mulan Weichang Xiaoluanhe National Wetland Park *
Xianghe Chaobaihe Dayunhe National Wetland Park
Huailai Guanting Shuiku National Wetland Park *
Zhangbei Huanggainao National Wetland Park
Shexian Qingzhanghe National Wetland Park
Chengde Shuangtashan Luanhe National Wetland Park *
Neiqiu Queshanhu National Wetland Park *
Fengfeng Fuyanghe National Wetland Park *
Longhua Yixunhe National Wetland Park *
Qinglonghu National Wetland Park
Renxian Daluze National Wetland Park
Lulong Yiqubaiku National Wetland Park
Luanping Chaohe National Wetland Park
Yuxian Huliuhe National Wetland Park
Zhuolu Sangganhe National Wetland Park
Yangyuan Sangganhe National Wetland Park
Shanxi
Gucheng National Wetland Park *
Changyuanhe National Wetland Park *
Qianquanhu National Wetland Park *
Shuanglonghu National Wetland Park *
Wenyuhe National Wetland Park *
Jiexiu Fenhe National Wetland Park *
Shenxi National Wetland Park *
Qinheyuan National Wetland Park *
Zhangzi Jingweihu National Wetland Park *
Jishan Fenhe National Wetland Park *
Xiaoyi Xiaohe National Wetland Park *
Jingle Fenhechuan National Wetland Park *
Hongtong Fenhe National Wetland Park *
Youyu Cangtouhe National Wetland Park *
Datong Sangganhe National Wetland Park *
Huairen Kouquanhe National Wetland Park *
Zuoquan Qingzhanghe National Wetland Park
Zezhou Danhe National Wetland Park
Yushe Zhangheyuan National Wetland Park
Shanyin Sangganhe National Wetland Park **
Inner Mongolia
Bailang Tao'erhe National Wetland Park *
Alxa Huanghe National Wetland Park *
Baotou Huanghe National Wetland Park *
Narin Hu National Wetland Park *
Bameihu National Wetland Park *
Ergun National Wetland Park *
Mianduhe National Wetland Park *
Suorqi National Wetland Park *
Xilinhe National Wetland Park *
Har'us Hai National Wetland Park *
Xar Us National Wetland Park *
Duolun Luanheyuan National Wetland Park *
Wuhai Longyouwan National Wetland Park *
Linhe Huanghe National Wetland Park *
Ulan Hot Tao'erhe National Wetland Park *
Shangduhe National Wetland Park, Zhenglan Banner * 
Bailang Olon Bugan National Wetland Park *
Zalantun Xiushui National Wetland Park *
Mohort National Wetland Park *
Chen Barag Tohoi National Wetland Park *
Bairin Yaluhe National Wetland Park
Manzhouli Erka National Wetland Park
Naiman Mengjiaduan National Wetland Park *
Baotou Hondlon He National Wetland Park *
Xinghe Qar Hu National Wetland Park
Dengkou Nailunhu National Wetland Park
Jining Bawanghe National Wetland Park
Ulan Nur National Wetland Park, Dalad Banner
Jalaid Chaor Tohin He National Wetland Park *
Hulstai Nur National Wetland Park, Horqin Left Rear Banner
Olji Moron He National Wetland Park, Bairin Left Banner
Manzhouli Holgin Bulag National Wetland Park
Nanmu Yakehe National Wetland Park *
Onor Changshouhu National Wetland Park *
Hulun Buir Yinlinghe National Wetland Park
Honggolj Yiminhe National Wetland Park *
Chaihe Gol National Wetland Park *
Morin Dawa Bayan National Wetland Park
Junmahu National Wetland Park, Zhengxiangbai Banner
Xilin Gol Jinghu National Wetland Park
Hunhe National Wetland Park, Qingshuihe
Liaoning
Tieling Lianhuahu National Wetland Park *
Dahuofang National Wetland Park *
Datanghe National Wetland Park *
Huanlonghu National Wetland Park *
Faku Huanzidong National Wetland Park *
Liaozhong Puhe National Wetland Park *
Fushun Shehe National Wetland Park *
Shenbei Qixing National Wetland Park *
Huludao Longxing National Wetland Park
Beizhen Xinlihu National Wetland Park *
Fengcheng Caohe National Wetland Park
Lingyuan Qinglonghe National Wetland Park
Panshan Raoyangwan National Wetland Park
Changtu Liaohe National Wetland Park
Kangping Liaohe National Wetland Park *
Yixian Dalinghe National Wetland Park
Panjin Liaohe National Wetland Park
Wensheng Taizihe National Wetland Park
Jilin
Mopanhu National Wetland Park *
Fuyu Dajinbei National Wetland Park *
Da'an Nenjiangwan National Wetland Park *
Dashitou Yaguanghu National Wetland Park *
Yushu Laoganjiang National Wetland Park (qualification cancelled on August 16, 2016)
Niuxintaobao National Wetland Park *
Zhenlai Huancheng National Wetland Park *
Dongliao Ciluhu National Wetland Park *
Changchun Beihu National Wetland Park *
Changbai Nilihe National Wetland Park *
Helong Quanshuihe National Wetland Park *
Tonghua Laguhe National Wetland Park *
Bajiazi Gudonghe National Wetland Park *
Changbaishan Jianshuihe National Wetland Park *
Ji'an Bawangchao National Wetland Park *
Linjiang Wudaogou National Wetland Park * 
Liaoyuan Fengminghu National Wetland Park 
Nong'an Taipingchi National Wetland Park
Changchun Xinlihu National Wetland Park
Baishan Zhubaohe National Wetland Park *
Wangqing Gayahe National Wetland Park *
Dunhua Qiuligou National Wetland Park
Siping Jiashutaihu National Wetland Park
Taonan Sihaihu National Wetland Park
Heilongjiang
Taiyangdao National Wetland Park *
Baiyupao National Wetland Park *
Fujin National Wetland Park *
Anbanghe National Wetland Park *
Tatouhuhe National Wetland Park *
Qiqihar Mingxingdao National Wetland Park *
Taihu National Wetland Park *
Zhaoyueshan National Wetland Park *
Tongjiang Sanjiangkou National Wetland Park *
Heixiazidao National Wetland Park *
Bayan Jiangwan National Wetland Park *
Dorbod Tianhu National Wetland Park *
Mayanhe National Wetland Park *
Zhaoyuan Lianhuahu National Wetland Park *
Mulan Songhuajiang National Wetland Park *
Baihuachuan National Wetland Park *
Binxian Erlonghu National Wetland Park
Tonghe Erlongtan National Wetland Park *
Yichun Maolanhekou National Wetland Park *
Hegang Shilihe National Wetland Park * 
Hulin National Wetland Park 
Tahe Guqigu National Wetland Park * 
Anda Gudahu National Wetland Park * 
Qitaihe Taoshanhu National Wetland Park * 
Harbin Songbei National Wetland Park *
Qinggang Jinghe National Wetland Park
Raohe Wusulijiang National Wetland Park *
Dongning Suifenhe National Wetland Park *
Qiqihar Jiangxindao National Wetland Park *
Hulanhekou National Wetland Park
Shangzhi Mayihe National Wetland Park
Fuyu Long'anqiao National Wetland Park *
Suibin Yueyahu National Wetland Park
Bei'an Uyer He National Wetland Park (alt. Uyerin Gol)
Harbin Alejindao National Wetland Park *
Mudanjiang Yanjiang National Wetland Park
Hailanghe National Wetland Park, Xi'an District
Fangzhenghu National Wetland Park
Harbin Ashihe National Wetland Park *
Daqing heiyuhu National Wetland Park
Nianzishan Yaluhe National Wetland Park
Heihe Kunhe National Wetland Park
Lanxi Hulanhe National Wetland Park
Xiaomulinghe National Wetland Park, 858 Farm
Muling Leifenghe National Wetland Park
Aihui Larbinhe National Wetland Park
Shanghai
Chongming Xisha National Wetland Park *
Wusong Paotaiwan National Wetland Park *
Jiangsu
Jiangyan Qinhu National Wetland Park *
Yangzhou Baoyinghu National Wetland Park *
Suzhou Taihu Hubin National Wetland Park *
Wuxi Changguangxi National Wetland Park *
Shajiabang National Wetland Park *
Nanjing Changjiang Xinjizhou National Wetland Park *
Suzhou Taihu National Wetland Park *
Wuxi Lianghong National Wetland Park *
Yangzhou Fenghuangdao National Wetland Park *
Taihu Sanshandao National Wetland Park *
Wuxi Lihu National Wetland Park *
Liyang Tianmuhu National Wetland Park * 
Jiulihu National Wetland Park *
Huai'an Guhuaihe National Wetland Park * 
Jurong Chishanhu National Wetland Park *
Kunshan Tianfu National Wetland Park *
Wujiang Tongli National Wetland Park * 
Xuzhou Pan'anhu National Wetland Park * 
Fengxian Huanghegudao Dashahe National Wetland Park *
Liyang Changdanghu National Wetland Park *
Peixian Anguohu National Wetland Park *
Jianhu Jiulongkou National Wetland Park *
Huai'an Baimahu National Wetland Park *
Donghai Xishuanghu National Wetland Park
Xinghua Lixiahe National Wetland Park
Jintan Changdanghu National Wetland Park *
Yancheng Dazonghu National Wetland Park **
Yangzhou Beihu National Wetland Park **
Zhejiang 
Hangzhou Xixi National Wetland Park *
Lishui Jiulong National Wetland Park *
Deqing Xiazhuhu National Wetland Park *
Quzhou Wuxijiang National Wetland Park *
Zhuji Baitahu National Wetland Park *
Changxing Xianshanhu National Wetland Park *
Hangzhouwan National Wetland Park *
Yuhuan Xuanmenwan National Wetland Park *
Tiantai Shifengxi National Wetland Park *
Yunhe Terraced Field National Wetland Park *
Pujiang Puyangjiang National Wetland Park *
Shaoxing Jianhu National Wetland Park
Jiaxing Yunhewan National Wetland Park **
Anhui
Taipinghu National Wetland Park *
Digou National Wetland Park *
Sixian Shilonghu National Wetland Park *
Sanchahe National Wetland Park *
Huainan Jiaoganghu National Wetland Park *
Taihe Shayinghe National Wetland Park *
Taihu Huatinghu National Wetland Park *
Yingzhou Xihu National Wetland Park *
Qiupuheyuan National Wetland Park *
Pingtianhu National Wetland Park *
Pihe National Wetland Park *
Daoyuan National Wetland Park *
Anqing Caizihu National Wetland Park *
Tongcheng Xizihu National Wetland Park
Jieshou Liangwan National Wetland Park *
Funan Wangjiaba National Wetland Park
Lixin Xifeihe National Wetland Park *
Feixi Sanhe National Wetland Park *
Xiuning Hengjiang National Wetland Park *
Luyang Dongpu National Wetland Park
Feidong Guanwan National Wetland Park
Chaohu Bandao National Wetland Park
Qianshan Qianshuihe National Wetland Park
Yingquan Quanshuiwan National Wetland Park
Huaibei Zhonghu National Wetland Park
Mengcheng Beifeihe National Wetland Park
Hefei Chaohu Hubin National Wetland Park
Huaining Guanyinhu National Wetland Park
Lai'an Chishanhu National Wetland Park
Fujian
Changle Minjiang Hekou National Wetland Park *
Ningde Donghu National Wetland Park (qualification cancelled on August 16, 2016)
Yong'an Longtou National Wetland Park *
Changting Tingjiang National Wetland Park *
Zhangping Nanyang National Wetland Park *
Yongchun Taoxi National Wetland Park *
Wuping Zhongshanhe National Wetland Park *
Zhenghe Nianshan National Wetland Park
Jianning Minjiangyuan National Wetland Park
Jiangxi
Kongmujiang National Wetland Park *
Dongpoyanghu National Wetland Park *
Dongjiangyuan National Wetland Park *
Xiuhe National Wetland Park *
Yaohu National Wetland Park *
Nanfeng Nuohu National Wetland Park *
Lushanxihai National Wetland Park *
Xiuheyuan National Wetland Park *
Lianjiang National Wetland Park *
Ganxian Dahujiang National Wetland Park *
Ganzhou Zhangjiang National Wetland Park *
Wannian Zhuxi National Wetland Park *
Shangyou Nanhu National Wetland Park *
Huichang Xiangjiang National Wetland Park *
Nancheng Hongmenhu National Wetland Park *
Wuyuan Raoheyuan National Wetland Park *
Jingdezhen Yutianhu National Wetland Park * 
Ningdu Meijiang National Wetland Park * 
Yingtan Xinjiang National Wetland Park *
Suichuan Wudoujiang National Wetland Park *
Sanqingshan Xinjiangyuan National Wetland Park *
Luling Ganjiang National Wetland Park
Luxi Shankouyan National Wetland Park *
Gao'an Jinjiang National Wetland Park
Xunwu Dongjiangyuan National Wetland Park *
Shicheng Ganjiangyuan National Wetland Park
Zixi Jiulonghu National Wetland Park
Hengfeng Cen'ganghe National Wetland Park *
Lianhua Lianjiang National Wetland Park
Chongyi Yangminghu National Wetland Park
Dayu Zhangshui National Wetland Park
Quannan Taojiang National Wetland Park
Wan'anhu National Wetland Park
Ruijin Mianjiang National Wetland Park
Jishui Jihu National Wetland Park
Xiajiang Yuxiahu National Wetland Park
Fuzhou Fengganghe National Wetland Park
Fuzhou Liaofang National Wetland Park
Guangchang Fuheyuan National Wetland Park
Nanfeng Tanhu National Wetland Park **
Shandong
Tengzhou Binhu National Wetland Park *
Tai'erzhuang Yunhe National Wetland Park *
Matahu National Wetland Park *
Jixi National Wetland Park *
Huanghe Meiguihu National Wetland Park *
Panlonghe National Wetland Park *
Xiashanhu National Wetland Park *
Yueliangwan National Wetland Park *
Anqiu Yongcuihu National Wetland Park *
Shouguang Binhai National Wetland Park *
Weishanhu National Wetland Park *
Wuhe National Wetland Park *
Shaohai National Wetland Park *
Jiulongwan National Wetland Park *
Jinan Baiyunhu National Wetland Park *
Huanghedao National Wetland Park *
Dongming Huanghe National Wetland Park *
Weifang Bailanghe National Wetland Park *
Shuhe National Wetland Park *
Junan Jilonghe National Wetland Park *
Dong'e Luoshenhu National Wetland Park *
Qufu Kongzihu National Wetland Park *
Wangwuhu National Wetland Park
Laizhouwan Jincang National Wetland Park (qualification cancelled on December 29, 2018)
Yunmenghu National Wetland Park * 
Yinan Wenhe National Wetland Park * 
Tanghe National Wetland Park * 
Yishuhe National Wetland Park * 
Yishui National Wetland Park * 
Pingyi Junhe National Wetland Park * 
Caoxian Huanghe Gudao National Wetland Park * 
Qingzhou Mihe National Wetland Park * 
Weifang Yuwang National Wetland Park * 
Changyi Binhai National Wetland Park * 
Boxing Madahu National Wetland Park * 
Zoucheng Taiping National Wetland Park * 
Rizhao Futuanhekou National Wetland Park * 
Muping Qinshuihekou National Wetland Park * 
Qingdao Tangdaowan National Wetland Park *
Liangshanpo National Wetland Park
Zhucheng Weihe National Wetland Park *
Sishui Siheyuan National Wetland Park *
Jinxiang Jinshuihu National Wetland Park *
Tai'an Wenhe National Wetland Park *
Feicheng Kangwanghe National Wetland Park *
Yucheng Tuhaihe National Wetland Park *
Qihe Huanghe Shuixiang National Wetland Park *
Shanxian Fulonghu National Wetland Park *
Chiping Jinniuhu National Wetland Park *
Xiajin Jiulongkou National Wetland Park *
Weihai Wuleidaowan National Wetland Park
Binzhou Qinhuanghe National Wetland Park *
Dongping Binhu National Wetland Park *
Rizhao Liangchenghekou National Wetland Park *
Laiwu Xueyehu National Wetland Park *
Gangcheng Dawenhe National Wetland Park *
Liaocheng Dongchanghu National Wetland Park *
Kenli Tianninghu National Wetland Park *
Dezhou Jianhe National Wetland Park *
Chengwu Dongyuhe National Wetland Park
Rizhao Xihu National Wetland Park
Boshan Wuyanghu National Wetland Park
Gaomi Jiaohe National Wetland Park *
Lanling Huibaohu National Wetland Park
Leling Yuemahe National Wetland Park
Juxian Shuhe National Wetland Park
Binzhou Xiaokaihe National Wetland Park *
Linqu Mihe National Wetland Park
Henan
Zhengzhou Huanghe National Wetland Park *
Huaiyang Longhu National Wetland Park *
Yanshi Yiluohe National Wetland Park (qualification cancelled on August 16, 2016)
Pingdingshan Baiguihu National Wetland Park *
Hebi Qihe National Wetland Park *
Shahe National Wetland Park, Luohe *
Tangyin Tanghe National Wetland Park *
Puyang Jindihe National Wetland Park *
Pingqiao Lianghekou National Wetland Park *
Nanyang Baihe National Wetland Park *
Tanghe National Wetland Park * 
Luhunhu National Wetland Park * 
Xiangcheng Fenquanhe National Wetland Park * 
Taiqian Jinshui National Wetland Park * 
Xixian Huaihe National Wetland Park * 
Minquan Huanghe Gudao National Wetland Park * 
Anyang Zhanghe Xiagu National Wetland Park * 
Linzhou Qihe Xihe National Wetland Park *
Changge Shuangjihe National Wetland Park *
Xichuan Danyanghu National Wetland Park *
Dengzhou Tuanhe National Wetland Park *
Biyang Tongshanhu National Wetland Park *
Zhecheng Ronghu National Wetland Park *
Suixian Zhongyuan Shuicheng National Wetland Park *
Yucheng Zhoushangyong Yunhe National Wetland Park (alt. Zhoukou-Shangqiu-Yongcheng Canal) *
Xiangcheng Beiruhe National Wetland Park
Guangshan Longshanhu National Wetland Park *
Xinxian Xiangshanhu National Wetland Park
Yichuan Yihe National Wetland Park *
Luyi Huijihe National Wetland Park
Nanle Majiahe National Wetland Park
Ruzhou Ruhe National Wetland Park
Wugang Shimantan National Wetland Park
Yanling Heminghu National Wetland Park
Yuzhou Yinghe National Wetland Park
Liangyuan Huanghe Gudao National Wetland Park
Hubei
Shennongjia Dajiuhu National Wetland Park *
Wuhan Donghu National Wetland Park *
Gucheng Hanjiang National Wetland Park *
Qichun Chilonghu National Wetland Park *
Chibi Lushuihu National Wetland Park *
Jingmen Zhanghe National Wetland Park *
Macheng Fuqiaohe National Wetland Park *
Huitinghu National Wetland Park *
Mochouhu National Wetland Park *
Daye Bao'anhu National Wetland Park *
Yidu Tianlongwan National Wetland Park *
Huanggang Yi'aihu National Wetland Park *
Jinshahu National Wetland Park *
Tiantanghu National Wetland Park *
Wushanhu National Wetland Park *
Fanwanhu National Wetland Park *
Changshoudao National Wetland Park *
Tongcheng Daxi National Wetland Park *
Chongyang Qingshan National Wetland Park *
Shayang Panjihu National Wetland Park *
Jiangxia Canglongdao National Wetland Park *
Zhushan Shengshuihu National Wetland Park *
Dangyang Qinglonghu National Wetland Park *
Zhuxi Longhu National Wetland Park *
Xishui Cehu National Wetland Park *
Xiantao Shahu National Wetland Park *
Wuhan Anshan National Wetland Park * 
Xiangyang Hanjiang National Wetland Park * 
Tongshan Fushuihu National Wetland Park * 
Fangxian Gu'nanhe National Wetland Park * 
Caidian Houguanhu National Wetland Park * 
Xiaogan Zhuhu National Wetland Park * 
Yuan'an Juhe National Wetland Park *
Songzi Weishui National Wetland Park * 
Shiyan Huanglongtan National Wetland Park *
Xuan'en Gongshuihe National Wetland Park *
Jingmen Xianjuhe National Wetland Park *
Suixian Fengjiangkou National Wetland Park *
Yicheng Wanyangzhou National Wetland Park *
Xianning Xiangyanghu National Wetland Park *
Changyang Qingjiang National Wetland Park *
Huanggang Bailianhe National Wetland Park *
Wuhan Dugonghu National Wetland Park *
Nanzhang Qinglianghe National Wetland Park *
Zhijiang Jinhu National Wetland Park *
Hanchuan Diaochahu National Wetland Park
Jingzhou Ancient City Ring National Wetland Park *
Gong'an Chonghu National Wetland Park *
Anlu Fuhe National Wetland Park *
Wufeng Baixihe National Wetland Park *
Xiaogan Laoguanhu National Wetland Park
Yingshan Zhangjiazui National Wetland Park *
Yunmeng Yunshui National Wetland Park *
Yiling Quanyitang National Wetland Park
Tianmen Zhangjiahu National Wetland Park *
Jingzhou Lingjiaohu National Wetland Park
Shishou Sanlinghu National Wetland Park
Guangshui Xujiahe National Wetland Park
Shiyan Yunyanghu National Wetland Park *
Yangxin Lianhuahu National Wetland Park
Jianli Laojianghe Gudao National Wetland Park
Jiayu Zhenhu National Wetland Park
Shiyan Sihe National Wetland Park
Laohekou Xipaizihu National Wetland Park
Suizhou Huaihe National Wetland Park
Zigui Jiuwanxi National Wetland Park
Hunan
Shuifumiao National Wetland Park *
Dongjianghu National Wetland Park *
Qianlonghu National Wetland Park *
Jiubujiang National Wetland Park *
Xuefenghu National Wetland Park *
Xiangyin Yangshahu - Donghu National Wetland Park *
Ningxiang Jinzhouhu National Wetland Park *
Jishou Donghe National Wetland Park *
Miluojiang National Wetland Park *
Maolihu National Wetland Park *
Wuqiangxi National Wetland Park *
Songyahu National Wetland Park *
Leishui National Wetland Park *
Shuyuanzhou National Wetland Park *
Xinqianghe National Wetland Park *
Nanzhou National Wetland Park *
Qionghu National Wetland Park *
Huangjiahu National Wetland Park *
Taoyuan Yuanshui National Wetland Park *
Hengdong Mishui National Wetland Park *
Chengbu Baiyunhu National Wetland Park
Jianghua Centianhe National Wetland Park *
Huitong Qushui National Wetland Park *
Longhui Weiyuanhu National Wetland Park *
Shaoyang Tianzihu National Wetland Park *
Lizhou Cenhuai National Wetland Park *
Guiyang Chongling National Wetland Park *
Xupu Simeng National Wetland Park *
Huarong Donghu National Wetland Park *
Shuangpai Riyuehu National Wetland Park *
Changning Tianhu National Wetland Park *
Suining Huayuange National Wetland Park *
Dong'an Zishui National Wetland Park *
Liling Guanzhuanghu National Wetland Park
Taojiang Xiunühu National Wetland Park *
Pingjiang Huangjinhe National Wetland Park *
Chaling Dongyanghu National Wetland Park *
Hongjiang Qingjianghu National Wetland Park *
Jingzhou Wulongtan National Wetland Park *
Dingcheng Niao'erzhou National Wetland Park *
Luxi Wushui National Wetland Park *
Huayuan Gumiaohe National Wetland Park *
Hengshan Xuanzhou National Wetland Park *
Xinshao Xiaoxi National Wetland Park *
Xinhua Longwan National Wetland Park *
Dongkou Pingxijiang National Wetland Park *
Hengnan Lianhuwan National Wetland Park *
Shimen Xianyanghu National Wetland Park *
Datonghu National Wetland Park *
Anren Yonglejiang National Wetland Park *
Heshan Laiyihu National Wetland Park
Chenzhou Xihe National Wetland Park *
Xinning Fuyijiang National Wetland Park
Jindong Mengjianghe National Wetland Park *
Ningyuan Jiuyihe National Wetland Park *
Tongdao Yudaihe National Wetland Park
Liuyanghe National Wetland Park *
Lianyuan Meifenghu National Wetland Park
Yunxi Bainihu National Wetland Park *
Baojing Youshui National Wetland Park *
Mayang Jinjiang National Wetland Park
Yongshun Mengdonghe National Wetland Park *
Lingling Xiaoshui National Wetland Park
Hanshou Xifenghu National Wetland Park
Changsha Yanghu National Wetland Park *
Zhongfang Wushui National Wetland Park
Jiahe Zhongshuihe National Wetland Park
Qiyang Wuxi National Wetland Park *
Linli Daoshuihe National Wetland Park *
Jiangyong Yongminghe National Wetland Park
Guangdong
Xinghu National Wetland Park *
Leizhou Jiulongshan Mangrove Forest National Wetland Park *
Ruyuan Nanshuihu National Wetland Park *
Wanlühu National Wetland Park *
Kongjiang National Wetland Park *
Dongjiang National Wetland Park *
Guangzhou Haizhu National Wetland Park *
Huaiji Yandu National Wetland Park *
Xinfeng Luguhe National Wetland Park *
Yunan Dahe National Wetland Park *
Hailingdao Mangrove Forest National Wetland Park *
Machong Huayanghu National Wetland Park *
Zhongshan Cuiheng National Wetland Park *
Luoding Jinyinhu National Wetland Park *
Wengyuan Wengjiangyuan National Wetland Park *
Huaduhu National Wetland Park *
Kaiping Kongquehu National Wetland Park
Yangdong Shouchanghe Mangrove Forest National Wetland Park
Xinhui Xiaoniaotiantang National Wetland Park (alt. Bird's Paradise) *
Sihui Suijiang National Wetland Park
Liannan Yaopai Terraced Field National Wetland Park
Shenzhen Huaqiaocheng National Wetland Park (Huaqiaocheng: a cultural theme park officially known as Overseas Chinese Town [OCT] in English) * 
Huizhou Tonghu National Wetland Park
Nanhai Jinshadao National Wetland Park
Sanshui Yundonghai National Wetland Park
Zhuhai Hengqin National Wetland Park
Taishan Zhenhaiwan Mangrove Forest National Wetland Park 
Guangxi
Beihai Binhai National Wetland Park *
Guilin Huixian Karst National Wetland Park *
Hengxian Xijin National Wetland Park *
Fuchuan Guishi National Wetland Park *
Du'an Chengjiang National Wetland Park *
Jingxi Longtan National Wetland Park *
Bose Fuluhe National Wetland Park * 
Lingyun Haokunhu National Wetland Park *
Pingguo Luxianhu National Wetland Park *
Daxin Heishuihe National Wetland Park *
Longzhou Zuojiang National Wetland Park *
Donglan Pohaohu National Wetland Park
Lipu Lijiang National Wetland Park *
Longsheng Longji Terraced Field National Wetland Park *
Nandan Laxi National Wetland Park *
Wuzhou Canghai National Wetland Park *
Nanning Dawangtan National Wetland Park *
Quanzhou Tianhu National Wetland Park
Guanyang Guanjiang National Wetland Park
Hezhou Hemianshihu National Wetland Park
Zhaoping Guijiang National Wetland Park
Xincheng Letan National Wetland Park
Heshan Luolinghu National Wetland Park
Xingbin Sanlihu National Wetland Park
Hainan
Xinying National Wetland Park *
Nanlihu National Wetland Park *
Sanya Donghe National Wetland Park
Changjiang Haiwei National Wetland Park
Haikou Wuyuanhe National Wetland Park *
Haikou Meishehe National Wetland Park *
Lingshui Mangrove Forest National Wetland Park
Chongqing
Yunwushan National Wetland Park *
Youshuihe National Wetland Park *
Huanghuadao National Wetland Park *
Apengjiang National Wetland Park *
Yingfenghu National Wetland Park *
Laixihe National Wetland Park *
Caiyunhu National Wetland Park *
Fujiang National Wetland Park *
Kaixian Hanfenghu National Wetland Park *
Longhe National Wetland Park *
Dachanghu National Wetland Park *
Qingshanhu National Wetland Park *
Yinglonghu National Wetland Park *
Bashanhu National Wetland Park *
Nanchuan Lixianghu National Wetland Park *
Xiushan Daxi National Wetland Park *
Shizhu Tengzigou National Wetland Park *
Tongliang Anju National Wetland Park *
Liangping Shuangguihu National Wetland Park *
Wulong Furonghu National Wetland Park *
Hechuan Sanjiang National Wetland Park
Qijiang Tonghuihe National Wetland Park
Sichuan
Pengzhou Jianjiang National Wetland Park (qualification cancelled on December 31, 2015)
Nanhe National Wetland Park *
Dawashan National Wetland Park *
Gouxihe National Wetland Park *
Suoluohu National Wetland Park *
Bailinhu National Wetland Park *
Zoigê National Wetland Park *
Suining Guanyinhu National Wetland Park *
Xichong Qinglonghu National Wetland Park *
Nanchong Shengzhonghu National Wetland Park
Qionghai National Wetland Park *
Yingshan Qingshuihu National Wetland Park *
Renshou Heilongtan National Wetland Park *
Xinjin Baihetan National Wetland Park *
Peng'an Xiangruhu National Wetland Park *
Longchang Guyuhu National Wetland Park *
Aba Domai Lingga National Wetland Park *
Hongyuan Garqu National Wetland Park *
Songpan Minjiangyuan National Wetland Park *
Pingchang Simahe National Wetland Park *
Guang'an Baiyunhu National Wetland Park
Naxi Fenghuanghu National Wetland Park *
Leibo Mahu National Wetland Park *
Baiyu Lalungco National Wetland Park
Mianyang Sanjianghu National Wetland Park *
Shawan Daduhe National Wetland Park *
Luhuo Xianshuihe National Wetland Park
Batang Zimeihu National Wetland Park
Jiangyou Rangshuihe National Wetland Park
Quxian Baishuihu National Wetland Park
Guizhou
Shiqian Yuanyanghu National Wetland Park *
Weining Suohuangcang National Wetland Park
Liupanshui Minghu National Wetland Park *
Yuqing Feilonghu National Wetland Park *
Sinan Bailuhu National Wetland Park *
Nayong Dapingqing National Wetland Park *
Yanhe Wujiang National Wetland Park *
Liupanshui Niangniangshan National Wetland Park *
Dejiang Baiguotuo National Wetland Park *
Xingyi Wanfeng National Wetland Park
Jiangkou National Wetland Park *
Anlong Zhaodi National Wetland Park *
Wanshan Changshouhu National Wetland Park *
Beipanjiang Daxiagu National Wetland Park *
Bijiang National Wetland Park *
Qinglong Guangzhaohu National Wetland Park *
Anshun Xingjianghe National Wetland Park *
Guiyang Ahahu National Wetland Park *
Luodian Mengjiang National Wetland Park *
Duyun Qingshuijiang National Wetland Park
Libo Huangjianghe National Wetland Park *
Guiding Bailonghe National Wetland Park *
Zunyi Leminhe National Wetland Park
Fenggang Longtanhe National Wetland Park *
Huichuan Labahe National Wetland Park *
Meitan Meijianghu National Wetland Park *
Xishui Dongfenghu National Wetland Park *
Liping Bazhouhe National Wetland Park *
Liupanshui Zangkejiang National Wetland Park
Qianxi Shuixi Kehai National Wetland Park
Congjiang Jiabang Terraced Field National Wetland Park *
Huishui Yulianghe National Wetland Park
Pingtang National Wetland Park
Fuquan Chahe National Wetland Park
Wuchuan Hongduhe National Wetland Park *
Qingzhen Hongfenghu National Wetland Park
Wangmo Beipanjiang National Wetland Park *
Ceheng Beipanjiang National Wetland Park
Guiyang Baihuahu National Wetland Park
Dushan Jiushijiutan National Wetland Park
Taijiang Wengnihe National Wetland Park
Xiuwen Yanyinghu National Wetland Park
Yuping Wuyanghe National Wetland Park *
Huangguoshu National Wetland Park
Yinjiang Chejiahe National Wetland Park
Yunnan
Honghe Hani Terraced Field National Wetland Park *
Eryuan Xihu National Wetland Park *
Puzhehei Karst National Wetland Park *
Pu'er Wuhu National Wetland Park *
Yingjiang National Wetland Park *
Heqing Dongcaohai National Wetland Park *
Mengzi Changqiaohai National Wetland Park
Shiping Yilonghu National Wetland Park *
Tonghai Qiluhu National Wetland Park *
Jinning Nandianchi National Wetland Park *
Zhanyi Xihe National Wetland Park
Yuxi Fuxianhu National Wetland Park *
Baoshan Qinghuahai National Wetland Park *
Luxi Huangcaozhou National Wetland Park
Lanping Qinghuadian National Wetland Park *
Jiangchuan Xingyunhu National Wetland Park *
Kunming Laoyuhe National Wetland Park
Lianghe Nandihe National Wetland Park
Tibet
Doqênco National Wetland Park *
Ya'nyi National Wetland Park *
Kanam National Wetland Park *
Tangra Yumco National Wetland Park *
Gyanai Yuco National Wetland Park *
Bainang Nyangqu He National Wetland Park *
Lhamoi Laco National Wetland Park *
Zhugla He National Wetland Park *
Ngari Shiquanhe National Wetland Park *
Riwoq Ziqu He National Wetland Park *
Qonggyai Qunggo He National Wetland Park *
Biru Naro National Wetland Park *
Qusum Xaglho National Wetland Park *
Zhoimalangco National Wetland Park *
Konjo Lhato National Wetland Park *
Nagqu Hangco National Wetland Park *
Xigazê Gyangsa National Wetland Park *
Banbar Jungraco National Wetland Park *
Cona Nara Yumco National Wetland Park
Bangoin Qinglung Maqu National Wetland Park
Baqên Yuxongco Alpine Periglacial National Wetland Park
Dêngqên Putog Hu National Wetland Park *
Shaanxi
Xi'an Chanba National Wetland Park * (note: rivers of Chanhe and Bahe)
Pucheng Luyanghu National Wetland Park *
Qianhu National Wetland Park *
Sanyuan Qingyuhe National Wetland Park *
Chunhua Yeyuhe National Wetland Park *
Tongchuan Zhaoshihe National Wetland Park *
Danfeng Danjiang National Wetland Park *
Ningqiang Hanshuiyuan National Wetland Park *
Xunheyuan National Wetland Park * 
Fengxian Jialingjiang National Wetland Park *
Taibai Shitouhe National Wetland Park *
Xunyi Malanhe National Wetland Park *
Qianweizhihui National Wetland Park *
Jushui National Wetland Park
Shangzhou Danjiangyuan National Wetland Park *
Xixiang Mumahe National Wetland Park *
Dali Chaoyi National Wetland Park *
Qiancenghe National Wetland Park *
Fufeng Qixinghe National Wetland Park *
Heyang Xushuihe National Wetland Park *
Qishan Luoxingwan National Wetland Park *
Meixian Longyuan National Wetland Park *
Fuping Shichuanhe National Wetland Park *
Yan'an Nanniwan National Wetland Park *
Baishui Lingaohu National Wetland Park *
Luonan Luoheyuan National Wetland Park
Tongguan Huanghe National Wetland Park
Yijun Fudihu National Wetland Park
Linwei Youhe National Wetland Park
Hanzhong Congtan National Wetland Park *
Pingli Guxianhu National Wetland Park
Hanyin Guanyinhe National Wetland Park
Xi'an Tianyuhe National Wetland Park
Fengxiang Yongchenghu National Wetland Park *
Yaozhou Juhe National Wetland Park
Zhenping Shuheyuan National Wetland Park *
Liquan Ganhe National Wetland Park
Shiquan Hanjiang Lianhua Gudu National Wetland Park
Yongshou Qishuihe National Wetland Park
Huazhou Shaohuahu National Wetland Park
Huayin Taihuahu National Wetland Park
Jingyang Jinghe National Wetland Park
Pucheng Luohe National Wetland Park *
Gansu
Zhangye National Wetland Park *
Lanzhou Qinwangchuan National Wetland Park *
Minqin Shiyanghe National Wetland Park *
Wenxian Huanglingou National Wetland Park *
Jiayuguan Caohu National Wetland Park *
Jiuquan Huachenghu National Wetland Park *
Kangxian Meiyuanhe National Wetland Park *
Jinta Beihaizi National Wetland Park
Jinchuan Jinshuihu National Wetland Park *
Yongchang Beihaizi National Wetland Park
Yongtai Baidunzi Salt Marsh National Wetland Park
Lintao Taohe National Wetland Park
Qinghai
Guide Huangheqing National Wetland Park *
Xining Huangshui National Wetland Park *
Taoheyuan National Wetland Park *
Dulan Alag Hu National Wetland Park *
Delhi Gahai National Wetland Park *
Madoi Donggi Conag Hu National Wetland Park *
Qilian Heiheyuan National Wetland Park *
Ulan Dulanhu National Wetland Park *
Yushu Baitang He National Wetland Park *
Tianjun Buh He National Wetland Park *
Huzhu Nanmenxia National Wetland Park *
Zêkog Zêqu National Wetland Park *
Baima Markog He National Wetland Park *
Qumarlêb Dêrqu Yuan National Wetland Park *
Ledu Dadiwan National Wetland Park
Gangca Shaliuhe National Wetland Park *
Guinan Mangqu National Wetland Park *
Gadê Baima Rintog National Wetland Park
Tarlag Huanghe National Wetland Park
Ningxia
Yinchuan National Wetland Park *
Shizuishan Xinghaihu National Wetland Park *
Wuzhong Huanghe National Wetland Park *
Huangsha Gudu National Wetland Park *
Qingtongxia Niaodao National Wetland Park *
Tianhu National Wetland Park *
Guyuan Qingshuihe National Wetland Park *
Hechuanhu National Wetland Park *
Taiyangshan National Wetland Park *
Jianquanhu National Wetland Park *
Zhenshuohu National Wetland Park *
Pingluo Tianhewan National Wetland Park *
Zhongwei Xiangshanhu National Wetland Park *
Yinchuan Huanghe Waitan National Wetland Park
Xinjiang
Sairam Hu National Wetland Park *
Ürümqi Chaiwopuhu National Wetland Park *
Manas National Wetland Park *
Uqilik National Wetland Park *
Altay Kran He National Wetland Park (qualification cancelled on December 22, 2017)
Aksu Dolan He National Wetland Park *
Hoboksar National Wetland Park *
Niya National Wetland Park *
Ulungur Hu National Wetland Park *
Larkol National Wetland Park *
Bosten Hu National Wetland Park *
Tacheng Wuxianhe National Wetland Park *
Shawan Qianquanhu National Wetland Park *
Ili Narat National Wetland Park *
Zepu Yarkant He National Wetland Park *
Eminhe National Wetland Park *
Yengisar National Wetland Park *
Yutian Keriya He National Wetland Park *
Wushi Toxkan He National Wetland Park *
Hamihe National Wetland Park *
Huocheng Ili Hegu National Wetland Park *
Yining Ili He National Wetland Park *
Ulungur He National Wetland Park, Qinghe *
Jeminay Alpine Periglacial Zone National Wetland Park *
Nilka Kax He National Wetland Park *
Burqin Tokkumut National Wetland Park
Makit Tangwanghu National Wetland Park *
Zhaosu Tekes He National Wetland Park *
Jimsar Beiting National Wetland Park *
Shule Xiangfeihu National Wetland Park
Shache Yarkant National Wetland Park *
Pamir Gaoyuan Aral National Wetland Park *
Fuyun Koktokay National Wetland Park
Bachu Baykol National Wetland Park
Yuli Lopnur National Wetland Park
Hoxud Taxhan National Wetland Park
Hutubi Dahaizi National Wetland Park
Tianshan Akyaz National Wetland Park
Wenquan Bortala He National Wetland Park
Tianshan Beipo Toutunhe National Wetland Park
Habahe Akqi National Wetland Park
Akqi Toxkan He National Wetland Park
Fukang Tenager National Wetland Park
Ili Yamat National Wetland Park
Tekes National Wetland Park
Yecheng Zonglang National Wetland Park
Zhaobishan National Wetland Park
Qapqal Ili He National Wetland Park
Ayding Hu National Wetland Park
Qira Damagou National Wetland Park
Yanqi Xiangsihu National Wetland Park
Bole Bortala He National Wetland Park
China Inner Mongolia Forest Industry Group Co., Ltd.
Genheyuan National Wetland Park *
Tol He National Wetland Park *
Niu'erhe National Wetland Park *
Chaoyuan National Wetland Park *
Ih Tol He National Wetland Park *
Dayangshu Kuilehe National Wetland Park *
Ganhe National Wetland Park *
Arxan Halh He National Wetland Park (alt. Halhiyn Gol) *
Kaluben National Wetland Park *
Huder He National Wetland Park *
Chaor Yaduoluo National Wetland Park *
Mangui Bei'ercihe National Wetland Park *
Forest Industry Bureau of Heilongjiang Province
Xinqing National Wetland Park *
Dongfanghong Nanchahu National Wetland Park
Hongxing Huojihe National Wetland Park
Xinglong Baiyangmuhe National Wetland Park *
Yabuli Hongxinghe National Forest Park *
Suiyang National Wetland Park *
Dongjingcheng Jingpohuyuan National Wetland Park *
Dahailin Erlanghe National Wetland Park
Daxing'anling Forestry Group Corporation
Emur National Wetland Park *
Shuangheyuan National Wetland Park *
Mohe Jiuqushibawan National Wetland Park *
Gulihe National Wetland Park *
Kanduhe National Wetland Park *
Huzhong Humaheyuan National Wetland Park *
Mohe Dalinhe National Wetland Park *
Shibazhan Humahe National Wetland Park *
Jagdaqi Ganhe National Wetland Park
Xinjiang Production and Construction Corps
Huyanghe National Wetland Park, XPCC Seventh Division
Qara Hu National Wetland Park, XPCC Second Division
Fengqinghu National Wetland Park, XPCC Tenth Division
Muzart National Wetland Park, XPCC Fourth Division
Humdan National Wetland Park, XPCC Fourteenth Division
Yukunlunhu National Wetland Park, XPCC Second Division

Note 1: Sites promoted to national-level on the basis of existing provincial wetland park since the implementation of revised Wetlands Conservation and Management Provisions on January 1, 2018.

Note 2: One of the disqualified pilot sites is yet to be verified due to lack of supporting documentation.

National Water Parks of China
Ratified by: Ministry of Water Resources
Number of NWPs (unit): 902 (as at December 23, 2021)
Total Number of Provincial WPs (unit): 1,000++
Ministry of Water Resources
Huanghe Xiaolangdi Hydro Junction
Huanghe Wanjiazhai Hydro Junction
Jinan Baili Huanghe Park
Changjiang Water Resources Commission
Danjiangkou Songtao Water Park
Danjiangkou Daba Water Park
Lushui Shuiku Water Park
Yellow River Conservancy Commission
Huanghe Sanmenxia Daba Park
Henan Huanghe Huayuankou Park
Shanxi Yongji Huanghe Pujindu Water Park
Kaifeng Huanghe Liuyuankou Water Park
Puyang Huanghe Water Park
Fanxian Huanghe Water Park
Jinsanjiao Huanghe Water Park, Tongguan
Zibo Huanghe Water Park, Shandong
Jiangjundu Huanghe Water Park, Taiqian, Henan
Mengzhou Huanghe Water Park, Henan
Binzhou Huanghe Water Park, Shandong
Dong'e Huanghe Water Park
Dezhou Huanghe Water Park
Huanghekou Water Park, Kenli
Shandong Zouping Huanghe Water Park
Shandong Heze Huanghe Water Park
Gansu Qingyang Nanxiaohegou Water Park
Henan Luoning Xizihu Water Park
Shandong Lijin Huanghe Water Park
Luoyang Mengjin Huanghe Water Park
Changyuan Huanghe Water Park
Lankao Huanghe Water Park
Huaihe River Commission
Shimantan Shuiku Park
Yihe Liujiadaokou Shuniu Water Park
Luomahu Zhangshan Water Park
Haihe River Water Resources Commission
Zhangweinan Yunhe Water Park
Panjiakou Water Park
Songliao River Water Resources Commission
Qarsan Shuiku Park
Nirji Water Park
Taihu Basin Authority
Taihu Pujiangyuan Water Park
Beijing
Shisanling Shuiku Resort
Qinglongxia Resort Village
Miaofengshan Water Park, Mentougou
Tianjin
Beiyunhe Water Park
Donglihu Park
Hebei
Qinhuangdao Taolinkou Park
Zhongshanhu Park
Yansaihu Park
Hengshuihu Park
Wuwushui Water Park, Pingshan  (locally pronounced Huhushui)
Jingnianghu Park, Wu'an
Qiannanyu Eco-Water Park, Xingtai
Fenghuanghu Water Park, Xingtai
Miaogong Shuiku Water Park, Chengde
Dongwushi Shuiku Water Park, Handan
Luanhe Ecological Flood Control Water Park, Qian'an
Shandianhe Shuiku Water Park, Guyuan
Huangtuliang Shuiku Water Park, Fengning
Weixian Lixiang Shuicheng Water Park
Linzhang Yecheng Gongyuan Water Park
Hengshui Fuyanghe Water Park
Xingtai Qilihe Water Park
Luanxian Luanhe Water Park
Xingtai Zijinshan Water Park
Baoding Yishuihu Water Park
Handan Guangfu Gucheng Water Park
Zhangjiakou Qingshuihe Water Park
Zhangjiakou Sangganhe Water Park
Shanxi
Fenhe Reservoir No.2 Park
Fenyuan Water Park
Taiyuan Fenhe Park
Zangshan Water Park, Yuxian
Shanliquan Water Park, Jincheng
Taihang Shuixiang Water Park, Pingshun
Sangganhe Wetland Water Park, Shuozhou
Cuifengshan Water Park, Yangquan
Changsheng Water Park, Liulin
Nuanquangou Water Park, Ningwu
Fenhe Shuiku Water Park
Beifang Shuicheng Water Park, Qinxian
Jingweihu Water Park, Zhangzi
Huyuan Water Park, Fanshi
Yuanping Hutuohe Water Park
Changzhi Zhangzehu Water Park
Huairen Emaohe Water Park
Yuncheng Boqinghe Water Park
Changzhi Houwan Shuiku Water Park
Inner Mongolia
Hongshanhu Water Park
Dahushi Water Park, Ningcheng
Shimen Water Park, Baotou
Batuwan Water Park
Huanghe Sanshenggong Water Park
Nanshan Soil and Water Conservation Eco-Demonstration Park, Chifeng
Dal Nur Water Park, Chifeng
Qixinghu Desert Water Park, Hanggin
Jinshan Water Park, Harqin
Qianyaozi Shuiku Water Park, Horinger
Hangali Shuiku Water Park, Horqin Right Middle Banner
Ordos Desert Grand Canyon Water Park
Xishanwan Water Park, Duolun
Chilechuan Har'us Hai Water Park, Hohhot
Shana Shuiku Water Park, Bairin Left Banner
Dalaha Hu Water Park, Ar Horqin
Erhuanghe Water Park, Bayannur
Fenghuanghu Water Park, Yakeshi
Baishi Water Park, Hohhot
Pishayan Water Park, Ordos
Dongjuyanhai Water Park, Ejin
Bayannur Delingshan Shuiku Water Park 
Chifeng Ders Borin Shuiku Water Park
Bayannur Langshan Shuiku Water Park
Wuhaihu Water Park, Wuhai
Baotou Nanhai Shidi Water Park
Ordos Machangou Shenlongsi Water Park
Ulanhot Tao'erhe Water Park
Bayannur Ujur He Water Park
Liaoning
Dahuofang Shuiku Park
Benxi Guanmenshan Park
Biliuhe Water Park, Dalian
Dalinghe Park, Chaoyang
Tanghe Shuiku Park
Guanshanhu Water Park, Fushun
Hunhe Water Park, Shenyang
Puhe Water Park, Shenyang
Tieling Fanhe Water Park
Harqin Zuoyi Longyuanhu Water Park
Fushun Hunhe Urban Area Water Park
Xinglongtai Liaohe Dingxiang Water Park
Jilin
Xinlihu Water Park
Yalujiang International Border Resort, Ji'an
Huanghe Shuiku Park, Panshi
Shitoukoumen Shuiku Water Park, Changchun
Taoyuanhu Water Park, Tonghua
Liangjiashan Water Park, Shulan
Jingyuetan Shuiku Park, Changchun
Julongtan Eco-Resort, Dongliao
Qagan Hu Water Park
Mopanhu Water Park, Meihekou
Changbai Shiwudaogou Water Park
Burhatonghe Water Park, Yanji
Longkeng Water Park, Songyuan
Songhuajiang Qingshui Lüdai Water Park, Jilin
Nenshuiyunbai Water Park, Baicheng
Erlonghu Water Park, Siping
Shahe Shuiku Water Park
Longfenghu Water Park, Changling
Ciluhu Water Park, Dongliao
Hadashan Water Park, Songyuan
Longmenhu Water Park, Helong
Helong Tumenjiangliuyu Hongqihe Water Park 
Songyuan Yanjiang Water Park
Da'an Niuxintaobao Water Park
Baicheng Nenjiangwan Water Park
Yongji Xingxingshao Water Park
Tongyu Xianghai Water Park
Linjiang Yalujiang Water Park
Jilin Xin'an Shuiku Water Park
Changchun Shuangyanghu Water Park
Siping Zhuanshanhu Water Park
Heilongjiang
Hongqipao Shuiku Honghu Resort
Longfengshan Water Park, Wuchang
Shankouhu Water Park, Wudalianchi
Yinhehu Water Park, Gannan
Laodonghu Water Park, Qiqihar
Liushudao Water Park, Jiamusi
Helihu Water Park, Hegang
Xingkaihu Flood Sluice No.2 Water Park, General Bureau of State Farms of Heilongjiang Province
Taiyangdao Water Park, Harbin
Xingkaihu Dangbi Water Park
Baiyupao Water Park, Harbin
Fabiela Water Park. Heihe
Qingnian Shuiku Water Park, Mishan
Ermenshan Shuiku Water Park, Sunwu
Hongxing Shidi Water Park, Yichun
Shangganling Water Park, Yichun
Wolonghu Water Park, Yichun
Wuyiling Water Park, Yichun
Xinqing Shidi Water Park, Yichun
Yichunhe Water Park, Yichun
Xiquanyan Water Park, Harbin
Hulan Fuqiang Water Park, Harbin
Jinhewan Water Park, Harbin
Heiyuhu Water Park, Daqing
Qingyuanhu Water Park, Hegang
Binshui Xinqu Water Park, Yichun
Hekou Water Park, Lanxi
Yichun Huilongwan Water Park
Tailai Taihu Water Park
Harbin Changshouhu Water Park
Hulanhekou Water Park
Shanghai
Shanghai Songjiang Eco-Water Park
Dianshanhu Park
Bihai Jinsha Water Park
Dishuihu Water Park, Pudong
Huangpujiang Xuhui Binjiang Water Park
Jiangsu
Tianmuhu Resort, Liyang
Jiangdu Hydro-Junction Resort
Yunlonghu Park, Xuzhou
Guazhou Ancient Ferry Park
Sanhezha Water Park
Taizhou Yinjianghe Park
Suzhou Xukou Water Park
Huai'an Hydro-Junction Park
Guyunhe Water Park, Huai'an
Tongyuhe Junction Park, Yancheng
Qinhu Park, Jiangyan
Jinniuhu Water Park, Nanjing
Hengshan Shuiku Water Park, Yixing
Wuxi Meilianghu Water Park
Fenghuanghe Water Park, Taizhou
Waiqinhuaihe Water Park, Nanjing
Zhongyunhe Water Park, Suqian
Guhuanghe Water Park, Xuzhou
Jincanghu Water Park, Taicang
Zhenzhuquan Water Park, Nanjing
Tianshengqiaohe Water Park, Nanjing
Aishan Jiulong Water Park, Pizhou
Xiaotashan Shuiku Water Park, Ganyu
Yinghuayuan Water Park, Huai'an
Longyou Water Park, Rugao
Changguangxi Water Park, Wuxi
Huaguoshan Dashenghu Water Park, Lianyungang
Baoyinghu Water Park, Baoying
Dazonghu Water Park, Yancheng
Sishuihe Water Park, Siyang
Tianquanhu Water Park, Xuyi
Qingyanyuan Water Park, Huai'an
Guhuaihe Water Park, Huai'an
Wangshan Water Park, Suzhou
Huanchenghe Water Park, Zhangjiagang
Fenghuangdao Water Park, Yangzhou
Pan'anhu Water Park, Xuzhou
Hailinghu Water Park, Lianyungang
Jinlonghu Water Park, Xuzhou Economic Development Zone
Jintan Yuchiwan Water Park
Kunshan Mingjingdang Water Park
Zhenjiang Jinshanhu Water Park
Lianghong Water Park, Wuxi New District
Suqian Sucheng Guhuanghe Water Park
Liyang Nanshan Zhuhai Water Park
Jiangyin Furonghu Water Park
Xuzhou Dingwanhu Water Park
Jinhu Hehuadang Water Park
Funing Jinshahu Water Park
Suqian Liutanghe Water Park
Yangzhou Guyunhe Water Park (alt. Ancient Canal)
Nanjing Xuanwuhu Water Park
Jurong Chishanhu Water Park
Yixing Zhuhai Water Park
Changzhou Yandanghe Water Park
Taizhou Fengchenghe Water Park
Yixing Huadongbaichang Water Park
Lianshui Wudaohu Water Park
Changzhou Qinglongtan Water Park
Taizhou Qianduo Water Park
Xuzhou Dashahe Water Park
Nanjing Chuhe (Pukou Section) Water Park
Jinhu Sanhewan Water Park
Yixing Yangxianhu Water Park
Zhejiang
Qianjiang Chaoyun Resort Village, Haining
Ningbo Tianhe Eco-Park
Tingxiahu Resort, Fenghua
Huzhou Taihu Resort
Tianfu Resort, Anji
Hangzhouwan Seaside Amusement Park, Cixi
Xialihu Eco-Park, Jiangshan
Wozhouhu Water Park, Xinchang
Huanchenghe Park, Shaoxing
Jiangshan Yuelianghu Water Park
Yaojiang Park, Yuyao
Tiantaishan Longchuanxia Water Park
Yunhe Garden along the Shaoxing Section of Ancient Zhedong Canal
Jiangnan Tianchi Water Park, Anji
Cao'ejiang City Defense Water Park, Shangyu
Yuhuan Water Park, Yuhuan
Nanminghu Water Park, Lishui
Laoshikan Shuiku Water Park, Anji
Cao'ejiang Dazha Water Park, Shaoxing
Qiongtai Xiangu Water Park, Tiantai
Wuxijiang Water Park, Quzhou
Fuchunjiang Water Park, Fuyang
Xin'anhu Water Park, Quzhou
Shibalicui Water Park, Suichang
Fuchunjiang Water Park, Tonglu
Songyinxi Water Park, Songyang
Shexiang Lülang Water Park, Jingning
Ningbo Dongqianhu Water Park
Yueqing Zhongyandangshan Water Park
Yongjia Huangtanxi Water Park
Huzhou Wuxing Taihu Lougang Water Park
Yunhe Titian Water Park
Jinhua Puyangjiang Water Park
Jinhua Zhezhong Daxiagu Water Park
Quzhou Majinxi Water Park
Jiaxing Haiyan Yulin Haitang Water Park (alt. Yulin Sea Embankment)
Huzhou Wuxing Xishanyang Water Park
Jinyun Haoxi Water Park
Jiande Xin'anjiang - Fuchunjiang Water Park
Anhui
Longhekou Water Resort
Taipinghu Park
Foziling Shuiku Park
Longzihu Park
Meishan Shuiku Water Park
Xianghongdian Shuiku Water Park
Huatinghu Water Park, Taihu
Huaihe Bengbuzha Junction Water Park
Qinglongwan Water Park
Hengpaitou Water Park, Lu'an
Shuimentang Water Park, Huoqiu
Luhu Zhuhai Water Park, Guangde
Taohuatan Park, Jingxian
Bawangshan Yaoling Xiushui Water Park, Shexian
Huaishang Mingzhu Water Park, Fengtai
Huaihe Linhuaigang Engineering Project Water Park
Bailuzhou Water Park, Bozhou
Wangjiaba Water Park, Funan
Jiaoganghu Water Park, Huainan
Shifoshan Tianzihu Water Park, Langxi
Huangshan Shimen Water Park
Binjiang Water Park, Wuhu
Pihe Water Park, Lu'an
Tianxia Water Park, Yuexi
Bailudao Water Park, Lai'an
Quanjiao Xianghe Water Park
Yuexi Dabieshan Caihong Pubu Water Park
Yingshang Balihe Water Park
Feidong Daishanhu Water Park
Hefei Binhu Water Park
Lu'an Youranlanxi Water Park
Xiuning Hengjiang Water Park
Chizhou Jiuhua Tianchi Water Park
Wangjiang Guleichi Water Park
Yixian Hongcun - Qishuhu Water Park
Suzhou Xinbianhe Water Park
Wuhu Taoxin Shuiyun Water Park
Chizhou Xinghuacun Water Park
Jinzhai Yanzihe Daxiagu Water Park
Feixi Sanhe Water Park
Nanling Dapu Water Park
Qimen Guniujiang Water Park
Tongling Tianjinghu Water Park
Fujian
Dongzhang Shuiku Shizhuhu Park, Fuqing
Jiulihu Park, Xianyou
Yanpinghu Park, Nanping
Taoyuandong Water Park, Yong'an
Tianmenshan Water Park, Yongtai
Daixianhu Water Park, Dehua
Minhu Water Park, Youxi
Meihuahu Water Park, Longyan
Jiulongjiang Water Park, Hua'an
Longhu Water Park, Yongding
Jiupengxi Water Park, Zhangping
Shanmei Shuiku Water Park, Quanzhou
Nantaiwu Xin'gangcheng Water Park, Zhangzhou Development Zone
Mulanbei Water Park, Putian
Taining Water Park, Sanming
Huayangshan Water Park, Shunchang
Donghu Water Park, Wuyishan
Nanjing Tulou Shuixiang Water Park
Shaowu Yunlingshan Water Park
Ningde Donghu Water Park
Quanzhou Jinji River Sluice Water Park
Liancheng Guanzhishan Water Park (locally pronounced Guanzhaishan)
Yongchun Taoxi Water Park
Shaowu Tiancheng Qixia Water Park
Xiamen Tianzhushan Water Park
Zherong Qinglanhu Water Park
Water Park in Taiwan Farmers Entrepreneurial Park of Zhangping
Putian Jiulonggu Water Park
Wuping Liangyeshan Yuncaxi Water Park
Ningde Yangzhong Water Park
Yongchun Jinjiangyuan Water Park
Water Park in Changting Soil and Water Conservation Scientific Education Park
Ningde Shuiyunjiudu Water Park
Xiapu Yangjiaxi Water Park
Shouning Xipu Water Park
Ningde Huotong Water Park
Quanzhou Longmenhu Water Park
Yongchun Waishan Yunhegu Water Park
Nanping Kaoting Water Park
Jiangxi
Shangyouhu Park
Yutianhu Water Park, Jingdezhen
Baihehu Water Park, Guixi
Jinggangshanhu Water Park, Jinggangshan
Tanhu Water Park, Nanfeng
Cuipinghu Water Park, Leping
Mayuan Sangu Water Park, Nancheng
Bailuhu Water Park, Taihe
Feijiantan Water Park, Yichun
Fengzehu Park, Shangrao
Sanjiang Water Park, Ganzhou　
Jiulonghu Water Park, Tonggu
Wugonghu Water Park, Anfu
Yuelianghu Water Park, Jingdezhen
Zhangling Shuiku Water Park, Duchang
Mingyuehu Water Park, Pingxiang
Hanxianhu Water Park, Huichang
Water Park in Ganfu Pingyuan Irrigation Area
Luhu Water Park, Xingzi
Yuanminghu Water Park, Yifeng
Mengshan Shuiku Water Park, Xinjian
Xixia Shuiku Water Park, Xinjian
Taohuayuan Water Park, Wuning
Lushanxihai Water Park, Jiujiang
Qunying Shuiku Water Park, Wannian
Sanqinghu Water Park, Yushan
Tongboshan Jiuxianhu Water Park, Guangfeng
Yiyang Guifenghu Water Park
Dexing Fenghuanghu Water Park
Ningdu Ganjiangyuan Water Park
Xingan Huangnibu Shuiku Water Park
Ji'an Luotan Water Park
Wuning Xihaiwan Water Park
Water Park in Jiangxi Soil and Water Conservation Ecological Science and Technology Park of De'an
Ruijin Chenshihu Water Park
Nancheng Zuixianhu Water Park
Ji'an Qingyuan Chanxi Water Park
Yiyang Longmenhu Water Park
Shicheng Qinjiang Water Park
Chongyi Kejia Titian Water Park
Dexing Damaoshan Shuangxihu Water Park
Yichun Henghui Water Park
Fuzhou Dajueshan Water Park
Ji'an Xiajiang Shuilishuniu Water Park (alt. Xiajiang Hydro Junction)
Yihuang Caoshan Water Park
Xinyu Bama Water Park
Shandong
Yimeng Lake
Dongying Tian'ehu Park
Jiangbei Shuicheng Park
Weihe Water Park, Zhucheng
Tianpinghu Park, Tai'an
Xianyuehu Park, Changle
Qingfenghu Park, Dongying
Wenhe Water Park, Anqiu
Mihe Water Park, Shouguang
Zhonghai Water Park, Binzhou
Dongcunhe Water Park, Haiyang
Jiaozhou Sanlihe Water Park
Luoshenhu Water Park, Dong'e
Sunwuhu Water Park, Guangrao
Ezhuang Soil and Water Conservation Eco-Park, Zibo
Laixihu Water Park, Laixi
Baodugu Guishehu Water Park, Zaozhuang
Weishanhu Shidi Honghe Water Park, Tengzhou
Kangwanghe Park, Feicheng
Yuqiuhu Water Park, Gaotang
Weihe Water Park, Changyi
Xiashanhu Water Park, Weifang
Matahu Water Park, Huantai
Yanmahu Water Park, Zaozhuang
Bailanghe Water Park, Weifang
Tai'erzhuang Yunhe Water Park, Zaozhuang
Taigonghu Water Park, Zibo
Qinkouhe Water Park, Zhanhua
Tangshuiya Shuiku Water Park, Linqu
Qianshenghu Water Park, Gaoqing
Jiaohe Water Park, Gaomi
Qingyunhu Water Park, Xintai
Zhuohe Water Park, Weifang
Baolonghe Water Park, Wendeng
Shaohai Water Park, Jiaozhou
Xueyehu Water Park, Laiwu
Tianyihu Water Park, Tai'an
Dongpinghu Water Park, Dongping
Zhaowanghe Water Park, Heze
Sanhehu Water Park, Binzhou
Tianmadao Water Park, Junan
Water Park in Xiaokaihe Irrigation Area
Yiheyuan Water Park, Yiyuan
Wuyanghu Water Park, Zibo
Renhe Shuiku Water Park, Qingzhou
Yishan Dongzhenhu Water Park, Linqu
Wulonghe Water Park, Laiyang
Juyuhu Water Park, Rushan
Zhuquan Water Park, Yinan
Fulonghu Water Park, Shanxian
Guchenghe Water Park, Huimin
Huanghedao Water Park, Wudi
Wangwu Shuiku Water Park, Longkou
Changchunhu Water Park, Qixia
Wanziqianhong Water Park, Sishui
Darushan Water Park, Rushan
Daixihe Water Park, Zouping
Jindu Longwanghu Water Park, Zhaoyuan
Tuhaihe Siyuanhu Water Park, Zhanhua
Huanghe Gudao Water Park, Xiajin
Dayuzhang Yinhuangguanqu Water Park, Boxing
Xiuyuanhe Water Park, Zhangqiu
Changqinghu Water Park, Jinan
Weishanhu Water Park, Weishan
Chenghe Water Park, Zaozhuang
Qufu Yihe Water Park
Jining Liaohe Water Park
Qingzhou Mihe Water Park
Shanxian Donggouhe Green Ecological Gallery Water Park 
Chiping Jinniuhu Water Park
Binzhou Qinhuanghe Water Park
Shouguang Judianhu Water Park
Yantai Zhifu Dagujiahe Water Park
Yucheng Da Yu Culture Water Park
Juye Zhushuihe Water Park
Yantai Muping Qinshuihe Water Park
Water Park in Handun Yellow River Irrigation Area of Binzhou
Linqu Mihe Water Park
Zouping Yinghuashan Water Park
Jinxiang Jinshuihu Water Park
Liaocheng Lianhu Water Park
Tai'an Culaishan Wenhe Water Park
Xiajin Jiulongkou Shidi Water Park
Rencheng Nanchi Water Park
Feicheng Longshanhe Water Park
Chengwu Wentinghu Water Park
Junan Jilonghe Water Park
Jinxiang Yangshanhu Water Park
Yucheng Tuhaihe Water Park
Juxian Shuhe Water Park
Qingzhou Yanghe Water Park
Yihe Water Park, Yishui
Dezhou Daqinghe Water Park
Linyi Yishuhe Water Park 
Yishui Xueshan Caihonggu Water Park
 Water Park in Weishan Irrigation Area of Liaocheng
Henan
Nanwan Park
Boshanhu Water Resort, Zhumadian
Yuntaishan Water Park
Zhaopinghu Park
Qunyinghu Park, Jiaozuo
Bo'ai Qingtianhe Park
Zhaikou Shuiku Park, Lingbao
Hongqi Channel
Tongshanhu Water Park
Xiangshanhu Water Park
Nianyushan Shuiku Park
Shimenhu Water Park, Xixia　　
Longshanhu Park, Guangshan
Baisha Shuiku Water Park
Wanghuahu Water Park, Fangcheng
Zhangwu Nanhai Shuiku Water Park, Anyang
Pohe Water Park, Xinyang
Suyahu Water Park, Zhumadian
Canghe Water Park, Weihui
Luhunhu Water Park
Shalihe Water Park, Luohe
Longwanggou Water Park, Nanyang
Beihu Water Park, Xinyang
Huanghe Gudao Shidi Water Park, Shangqiu
Yahekou Shuiku Water Park, Nanyang
Huanghe Eco-Water Park, Zhengzhou
Ronghu Water Park, Zhecheng
Shangqiu Gucheng Water Park, Shangqiu
Banqiao Shuiku Water Park, Zhumadian
Yinghe Water Park, Yuzhou
Wuzhi Jiayingguan Huanghe Water Park
Yongcheng Tuohe Riyuehu Water Park
Huaiyang Longhu Water Park
Minquan Huanghe Gudao Water Park
Suixian Beihu Eco-Water Park
Xuchang Caowei Gudu Water Park
Yucheng Xianghe Water Park
Xingyang Gubaidu South-to-North Water Diversion Yellow River Under-crossing Water Park
Linzhou Taihangpinghu Water Park
Nanle Xihu Eco-Water Park
Jiyuan Qinlongxia Water Park
Xuchang Heminghu Water Park
Zhengzhou Longhu Water Park
Ruzhou Beiruhe Water Park
Hubei
Zhanghe Park
Longlingong Park
Jingshan Huitinghu Park
Sandaohe Shuijinghu Park, Xiangyang
Wenxiahu Water Park, Zhongxiang
Weishui Water Park, Jingzhou
Wuhan Xiajiasi Water Park
Jiangtan Water Park, Wuhan
Guanyinhu Water Park, Xiaochang
Tiantanghu Water Park, Luotian
Bishenghu Water Park, Yingshan
Fushuihu Water Park, Tongshan
Qingjiang Water Park, Changyang
Macheng Fuqiaohe Water Park
Yunxi Tianhe Water Park
Jingzhou Beizha Water Park
Huanggang Bailianhe Water Park
Yichang Bailihuang Water Park
Macheng Mingshan Water Park
Wuhan Jinyinhu Water Park
Qichun Datong Shuiku Water Park
Wuxue Meichuan Shuiku Water Park
Qianjiang Tianguandao Water Park
Yichang Gaolanhe Water Park
Shiyan Taihe Meihuagu Water Park
Xingshan Nanyanghe Water Park
Yuan'an Huilongwan Water Park
Qianjiang Xinglong Water Park
Hunan
Zhangjiajie Loujiang Park
Hunan Shuifu Water Park
Jiulongtan Daxiagu Water Park
Hengdong Mishui Water Park
Changsha Xiangjiang Water Park
Jiubujiang Water Park
Yuxingshan Water Park, Yiyang
Bianjiang Water Park, Yongxing　　
Qianlonghu Eco-Resort Village, Changsha
Dalongdong Water Park, Xiangxi
Yangmingshan Water Park, Shuangpai
Zaoshi Water Park
Changtangang Water Park, Fenghuang
Jiuguanhu Water Park, Hengshan
Zhinühu Water Park, Hengyang
Huangcai Shuiku Water Park, Changsha
Ziquejie Water Park, Xinhua
Qingnian Shuiku Water Park, Shaoshan
Xiepiyan Shuiku Water Park, Hengyang
Huayuan Biancheng Water Park, Huayuan
Cailun Zhuhai Water Park, Leiyang
Wangjiachang Water Park, Lixian
Yanzidong Water Park, Chenxi
Liuyehu Water Park, Changde
Huangjiahu Water Park, Yiyang
Xiaoxiangyuan Water Park, Jianghua
Water Park in Shaoshan Irrigation Area of Xiangtan
Hanshou Qingshuihu Water Park
Zixing Dongjianghu Water Park
Jiangyong Qianjiadong Water Park
Yongxing Qingshanlong - Longtan Water Park
Lanshan Xiangjiangyuan Water Park
Wangcheng Bandao Water Park
Rucheng Reshuihe Water Park
Chenzhou Siqinghu Water Park
Lianyuan Yangjiatan Water Park
Hepinghu Water Park, Zhijiang
Changsha Yanghu Shidi Water Park
Qiyang Wuxi Water Park
Zhuzhou Xiangjiang Scenic Belt Water Park
Yongzhou Jindong Baishuihe Water Park
 Zhuzhou Wanfenghu Water Park
Guangdong
Feilaixia Hydro Junction Resort
Yuhu Park, Maoming
Xiaoliang Soil and Water Conservation Eco-Park, Maoming
Huizhou Baipenhu Eco-Park
Huaihua Wulongxi Water Park
Dongtianhu Water Park, Meizhou
Yitang Shuiku Water Park, Wuhua
Huangchuan Sanxia Water Park, Lianzhou
Zengjiang Hualang Water Park, Zengcheng
Danxiayuan Water Park, Renhua
Zhuhai Zhuzhou Shuixian Water Park
Guangzhou Baiyunhu Water Park
Zhanjiang Hedi Yinhu Water Park
Guangzhou Huaduhu Water Park
Foshan Lecong Water Park
Guangxi
Chengbihe Water Park, Bose
Hongchaojiang Water Park, Beihai
Nanning Dawangtan Water Park
Nanning Tianbao Shuiku Water Park
Jianhe Water Park, Debao
Yuedaohu Water Park, Luzhai
Bachuanhe Dixia Daxiagu Water Park, Nandan
Rongjiang Hegu Water Park, Liucheng
Xiangjiang Water Park, Xiangzhou
Jingxi Longtan Equan Water Park
Du'an Chengjiang Water Park
Guilin Lingqu Water Park
Longlin Wanfenghu Water Park
Hainan
Songtao Shuiku Park
Nanlihu Water Park, Ding'an
Qionghai Heshui Shuiku Water Park
Baoting Maozhen Shuiku (Shenyudao) Water Park
Haikou Meishehe Water Park
Chongqing
Longshuihu Park, Dazu
Qingxigou Water Park, Jiangjin
Dagou Shuiku Water Park, Bishan
Shuanglonghu Water Park, Hechuan
Xiaonanhai Water Park, Qianjiang
Shanhuguan Shuiku Water Park, Wulong
Congkan Shuiku Water Park, Tongnan
Longhe Water Park, Shizhu
Nanbinlu Water Park
Qinjian Shuiku Water Park, Yongchuan
Hanfenghu Water Park, Kaixian
Bishan Bi'nanhe Water Park
Wulong Yangshuihe Water Park
Rongchang Rongfenghe Water Park
Fengdu Longhegu Water Park
Sichuan
Xianhai Park
Lubanhu Park
Baishuihu Park, Anxian
Shuangxihu Park, Zigong
Jianshan Water Park, Zigong
Luguhu Water Park, Liangshan
Jiangkou Shuixiang Water Park, Pingchang
Dashen Nanhai Water Park, Peng'an
Dujiangyan Water Park
Shuimo Zangzhai Water Park, Wenchuan
Fujiang Liuxia Water Park, Mianyang
Heilongtan Water Park, Meishan
Guyumiao Shuiku Water Park, Longchang
Shengzhonghu Water Park, Nanchong
Bailuhu Water Park, Cangxi
Qinglonghu Water Park, Xichong
Qiongjiangyuan Water Park, Suining
Leshan Daduhe Jinkou Daxiagu Water Park
Ebian Da- Xiao-dujuanchi Water Park
Qianwei Suoluohu Water Park
Peng'an Jialing Diyisangzi Water Park  (Jialing Diyisangzi: “Number One Hometown in the [river basin of] Jialing”, in memory of Sima Xiangru, a great prose poet of the Western Han dynasty)
Langzhong Jinshahu Water Park
Qingchuan Qingzhujiang Water Park
Wusheng Taijihu Water Park
Jinkouhe Dawashan Wuchi Water Park
Dazhu Baidaohu Water Park
Kaijiang Baoshiqiao Shuiku Water Park
Ya'an Feixianhu Water Park
Neijiang Huanghehu Water Park
Bazhong Huahu Water Park
Guang'an Baiyunhu Water Park
Xichang Qionghai Water Park
Luzhou Zhangba Water Park
Zamtang Raqu He Water Park
Nanbu Hongyanzihu Water Park
Guang'an Huayingshan Tianchihu Water Park
Ya'an Longxihe Shangli Guzhen Water Park
Nanjiang Yuhu Water Park
Suining Guanyinhu Water Park
Liangshan Anninghu Water Park
Guang'an Tianyigu Water Park
Bazhong Liujinhu Water Park
Miyi Miyanghu Water Park
Huili Xianrenhu Water Park
Tongjiang Dongjun Shuixiang Water Park
Guizhou
Zhenyuan Wuyanghe Water Resort
Zhijin Konglonghu Water Resort
Cengong Long'aohe Water Park
Sanchahe Water Park
Wuyanghu Water Park
Dujuanhu Park
Bijie Tianhe Water Park
Songbaishan Water Park
Longli Eco-Tech Demonstration Park
Jinmang Linhai Water Park, Guiyang
Minghu Water Park, Liupanshui
Muchenghe Water Park, Guanling
Dabanshui Water Park, Zunyi
Yonglehu Water Park, Guiyang
Wujiang Shanxia Water Park, Yanhe
Gaoyuan Qiandaohu Water Park, Luodian
Lianjiang Water Park, Huishui
Yang'ashahu Water Park, Jianhe
Jinjiang Water Park, Tongren
Wuyanghe Water Park, Shibing
Zhijinguan Water Park, Zhijin
Longli Lianhua Water Park
Jinping Sanjiang Water Park
Sinan Wujiang Water Park
Suiyang Shuangmenxia Water Park
Dafang Shexiang Jiuyi Water Park
Weining Caohai Water Park
Kaiyang Qinglonghe Water Park
Kaili Qingshuijiang Water Park
Fuquan Sajingu Water Park
Guiding Jinhaixueshan Water Park
Tongren Baiyanhe Water Park
Zunyi Maotaidu Water Park
Yongjiang Water Park, Qiannan
Yunnan
Zhujiangyuan Park
Wuzhe Hot Spring Park, Luxi
Meizihu Water Park, Pu'er
Mianyangchong Resort Village, Jianshui
Ximu Shuiku Park, Jinggu
Alahu Park, Luxi
Kongquehu Eco-Park, Mangshi
Mengsuo Longtan Water Park, Ximeng
Beimiaohu Water Park, Baoshan
Cibihu Water Park, Eryuan
Aluhu Water Park, Luxi
Bailonghu Water Park, Qiubei
Ximahe Water Park, Pu'er
Lashihai Water Park, Yulong, Lijiang
Junlonghu Water Park, Wenshan
Qinghaihu Water Park, Xiangyun
Yiliang Jiuxiang Mingyuehu Water Park
Lincang Bingdao Water Park
Shuangbai Chamuhu Water Park
Qiubei Nalonghu Water Park
Lijiang Liyuhe Water Park
Dayao Qinglinghu Water Park
Qingshanhu Water Park, Chuxiong
Tibet
Comogyiri Hu Water Park, Nyingchi
Yarlung Hegu Water Park, Nêdong
Lhasa He Water Park, Lhasa
Shaanxi
Jinyanghu Eco-Park
Hanzhong Shimen Water Park
Huanghehun Eco-Resort
Yinghu Park, Ankang
Hongsihu Park, Nanzheng
Youyihu Recreational Mountain Resort, Weinan
Park in Baliu Ecological Comprehensive Development Park
Danjiang Water Park, Shangluo
Nanshahu Water Park, Chenggu
Zhengguoqu Water Park
Longjuzhai Water Park, Danfeng
Jialingjiangyuan Water Park, Fengxian
Qianhu Water Park, Baoji
Hanchenghu Water Park, Xian
Weishuizhiyang Water Park, Baoji
Jinsi Daxiagu Water Park, Shangnan
Huangbaiyuan Water Park, Taibai
Cuihuashan Water Park, X i'an
Baqiao Shidi Water Park, X i'an
Huanghe Hukou Water Park, Yichuan
Hongjiannao Water Park, Shenmu
Huxian Qinglongxia Water Park
Taibai Qingfengxia Water Park
Heyang Qiachuan Water Park (Qiachuan: locally pronounced Hechuan)
Danfeng Taohuagu Water Park
Zhashui Qianyouheyuan Water Park
Water Park in Xi'an Expo Park 
Qishan Qiwei Water Park
Hanyin Fengyan Ancient Terraced Field Water Park
Baoji Taibaishan Water Park
Fengdong Fenghe Water Park
Weinan Luyanghu Water Park
Meixian Bawei Guanzhong Culture Water Park
Langao Qiancenghe Water Park
Mizhi Gaoxigou Water Park
Yanchuan Qiankunwan Water Park
Xi'an Weihe Eco-Water Park
Zhenping Feiduxia Water Park
Ankang Renhe Water Park
Xi'an Qujiangchi - Datang Furongyuan Water Park (Datang Furongyuan: a cultural theme park officially known as Tang Paradise in English)
Xi'an Huchenghe Water Park (alt. Xi'an Moat)
Gansu
Yuanyangchi Water Park, Jinta
Liangzhou Tiantishan Water Park
Kongtong Shuiku Park, Pingliang
Chijinxia Water Park, Jiuquan
Dahuwan Park, Gaotai
Zhulinsi Shuiku Park, Zhuanglang
Tianjiagou Soil and Water Conservation Eco-Park, Jingchuan
Yuyuan Water Park
Guazhouyuan Water Park, Guazhou
Shuangquanhu Water Park, Linze
Erbahu Water Park, Zhangye
Dayekou Shuiku Water Park, Zhangye
Wanxiahu Water Park, Xihe
Pingchuan Shuiku Water Park, Linze
Liqiao Shuiku Water Park, Shandan
Jinshanhu Water Park, Aksay
Bailongjiang Lazikou Water Park, Têwo
Yeliguan Water Park, Lintan
Hongyashan Shuiku Water Park, Minqin
Danghe Fengqingxian Water Park, Dunhuang
Huanghe Shouqu Water Park, Maqu
Yangba Water Park, Kangxian
Taohe Water Park, Jonê
Liangdang Yunpinghe Water Park
Chongxin Longzehu Water Park
Sunan Longchanghe Fengqingxian Water Park
Qingyanghu Water Park, Qingyang
Jingdian Water Park (Jiangdian: Jingtaichuan Electric Pumping Irrigation [Enjineering Project])
Qinghai
Nanmenxia Shuiku Park, Huzhu
Changlinggou Park
Huanghe Zoulang Water Park, Huangnan
Mengda Tianchi Water Park, Xunhua
Heiquan Shuiku Water Park
Beishan Water Park, Huzhu
Nyainboyuzê Water Park, Jigzhi
Sanchuan Huanghe Water Park, Minhe
Huangheyuan Water Park, Madoi
Lancangjiang Water Park, Nangqên
Bayan He Water Park, Haixi
Jinzihai Water Park, Ulan
Yushu Tongtianhe Water Park
Ningxia
Qingtongxia Tanglaizha Park
Shapotou Water Park
Aiyihe Water Park, Yinchuan
Xinghaihu Water Park, Shizuishan
Yazidang Water Park, Lingwu
Shahu Water Park
Tengger Shidi Water Park, Zhongwei
Ruhe Water Park, Pengyang
Qingliuhe Water Park, Longde
Mingcuihu Water Park, Yinchuan
Pengyang Yangwa Liuyu Water Park
Yinchuan Huanghe Hengcheng Water Park
Xinjiang
Kizil Shuiku Park
Xihaiwan Mingzhu Park, Bayingolin
Kax He Longkou Water Park, Ili
Uluwat Water Park
Karez Water Park, Turpan
Tacheng Karangur Water Park
Shimenzi Shuiku Water Park, Changji
Qianquanhu Water Park, Shawan
Tianshan Tianchi Water Park
Kurdenin Water Park, Gongliu
Dawakol Shamo Water Park, Yopurga
Yehetaogou Water Park, Gongliu
Kashi Tuman He Water Park
Xinjiang Production and Construction Corps
Shihezi Beihu Resort, XPCC Eighth Division
Qinggedahu Water Park
Xihaiwan Water Park
Tarim Dolan Hu Park
Qianniaohu Park
Shuanghu Water Park
Bayan Mountain Resort
Shihezi Taoyuan Park
Tarim Xianglonghu Park
Burultokay Xihai Water Park, Fuhai

National Grassland Nature Parks of China
Ratified by: State Forestry and Grassland Administration
Number of NGNPs (unit): 39 (as at September 17, 2020)
Area of NGNPs (10,000 ha): 14.7
Heilongjiang
854 Nongchang National Grassland Nature Park, General Bureau of State Farms of Heilongjiang Province (alt. 854 Farm)
Inner Mongolia
Cilechuan National Grassland Nature Park
Temeji National Grassland Nature Park
Talinhua National Grassland Nature Park
Erenhot National Grassland Nature Park
Bayan Kulun National Grassland Nature Park
Modon Muchang National Grassland Nature Park (Muchang: Ranch)
Ganggin Xil National Grassland Nature Park
Dong Ujimqin National Grassland Nature Park
Helan Caoyuan National Grassland Nature Park
Salqin National Grassland Nature Park
Bor Hua National Grassland Nature Park
Burhant National Grassland Nature Park
Ulgai National Grassland Nature Park
Tubtai National Grassland Nature Park
Hebei
Huangtuwan National Grassland Nature Park
Qagan Nur National Grassland Nature Park
Shanxi
Huapo National Grassland Nature Park
Qinshui Shifan Muchang National Grassland Nature Park (Shifan Muchang: Demonstration Ranch)
Wanbaoshan National Grassland Nature Park
Hunan
Nantan National Grassland Nature Park
Yanzishan National Grassland Nature Park
Sichuan
Gemu National Grassland Nature Park
Zangba National Grassland Nature Park
Waqên National Grassland Nature Park (alt. Waqie)
Yunnan
Xiangbaichang National Grassland Nature Park
Fenglongshan National Grassland Nature Park
Tibet
Nagzê National Grassland Nature Park
Chigu National Grassland Nature Park
Kaimar National Grassland Nature Park
Gansu
Waiwaincang National Grassland Nature Park (alt. Awancang)
Meiren National Grassland Nature Park, Hezuo
Qinghai
Sujiwan National Grassland Nature Park
Monqi Amho National Grassland Nature Park, Henan Mongol Autonomous County (alt. Amuhu)
Cuorigeng National Grassland Nature Park, Zêkog
Hongjungou National Grassland Nature Park
Ningxia
Xihuashan National Grassland Nature Park
Xiangshansi National Grassland Nature Park
Xinjiang Production and Construction Corps
Tianmu Caoyuan National Grassland Nature Park

National Desert (Rocky Desert) Parks of China
Ratified by: State Forestry and Grassland Administration
Number of NDPs (incl. NRDPs, unit): 128 (as at May 26, 2022)
Hebei
Weichang Ar Bulag National Desert Park
Fengning Xiaobazi National Desert Park
Guyuan Jiuliancheng National Desert Park
Shanxi
Youyu Huangshawa National Desert Park
Datong Xiping National Desert Park
Huairen Jinshatan National Desert Park
Shuocheng Majialiang National Desert Park
Zuoyun Guanjiabu National Desert Park
Tianzhen Biancheng National Desert Park
Zuoyun Que'ershan National Desert Park
Datong Shawo National Desert Park
Tianzhen Mixinguan National Desert Park
Datong Nanjiao Shilihe National Desert Park
Xinrong Wuqi National Desert Park
Pianguan Linhu National Desert Park
Inner Mongolia
Hobq Qixinghu National Desert Park 
Dengkou Xaxin Tohoi National Desert Park
Uxin Sulige National Desert Park
Wuhai Jinshawan National Desert Park
Ongniud Boronhi National Desert Park
Naiman Bugat National Desert Park
Hure Yinshawan National Desert Park
U Bulag National Desert Park, Urad Rear Banner
Gogastai National Desert Park, Zhenglan Banner
Dashatou National Desert Park, Otog Front Banner
Habuqigai National Desert Park, West Ujimqin Banner
Linhe Ulan Tug National Desert Park
Onggon Mangh National Desert Park, Uxin Banner
Jiukeshu National Desert Park, Alxa Right Banner
Shahaihu National Desert Park, Hanggin Rear Banner
Liaoning
Zhangwu Daqinggou National Desert Park
Kangping Jinshatan National Desert Park
Zhangwu Sihecheng National Desert Park
Hubei
Chongyang Yushan National Rocky Desert Park
Hunan
Anhua Yuntaishan National Rocky Desert Park
Leiyang Wugongxian National Rocky Desert Park
Xinning National Rocky Desert Park
Shimen Changti'ai National Rocky Desert Park
Linli Kemushan National Rocky Desert Park
Zhangjiajie Hongshilin National Rocky Desert Park
Yizhang Chishi National Rocky Desert Park
Xupu Leifengshan National Rocky Desert Park
Lianyuan Fukou National Rocky Desert Park
Taoyuan Laozuyan National Rocky Desert Park
Shaoyang Jigongyan National Rocky Desert Park
Guiyang Sizhoushan National Rocky Desert Park
Dong'an Duxiufeng National Rocky Desert Park
Xintian Daguanbao National Rocky Desert Park
Hecheng Huangyan National Rocky Desert Park
Guangdong
Liancheng Wanshanchaowang National Rocky Desert Park
Ruyuan Xijing Gudao National Rocky Desert Park
Guangxi
Binyang Baxianyan National Rocky Desert Park
Huanjiang National Rocky Desert Park
Sichuan
Xingwen Fengyan National Rocky Desert Park
Yunnan
Luliang Caise Shalin National Desert Park
Yanshan Weimo National Rocky Desert Park
Xichou National Rocky Desert Park
Jianshui Tianzhuta National Rocky Desert Park
Yiliang National Rocky Desert Park
Luxi Baishiyan National Rocky Desert Park
Mile Yunfengshan National Rocky Desert Park
Qiubei Shede National Rocky Desert Park
Shaanxi
Dali National Desert Park
Dingbian Maliantan National Desert Park
Gansu
Aksay National Desert Park
Dunhuang Yangguan National Desert Park
Linze Xiaoquanzi National Desert Park
Liangzhou Toudunying National Desert Park
Jinchang National Desert Park
Minqin Shajingzi National Desert Park
Gaotai Luotuoyi National Desert Park
Jinta Lanhewan National Desert Park
Yumen Qingshan National Desert Park
Minqin Huang'antan National Desert Park
Liangzhou Jiuduntan National Desert Park
Suzhou Tianluocheng National Desert Park
Qinghai
Guinan Huangshatou National Desert Park
Ulan Jinzihai National Desert Park
Dulan Tebh National Desert Park
Mangnai Qianfoya National Desert Park
Haiyan Ketu National Desert Park
Qumarlêb Tongtianhe National Desert Park
Ulan Quanshuiwan National Desert Park
Zêkog Hor National Desert Park
Golmud Tuolahai National Desert Park
Lenghu Yardang National Desert Park
Maqên Youyun National Desert Park
Guinan Lucang National Desert Park
Ningxia
Shapotou National Desert Park
Lingwu Baijitan National Desert Park
Yanchi Shabianzi National Desert Park
Pingluo Miaomiaohu National Desert Park
Xinjiang
Fukang Wutonggou National Desert Park
Jimsar National Desert Park
Qitai Petrified Wood National Desert Park
Mori Mingshashan National Desert Park
Yuli National Desert Park
Qiemo National Desert Park
Xayar National Desert Park
Shanshan National Desert Park
Yiwu Euphrates Poplar Forest National Desert Park
Lop Yurung Wan National Desert Park
Bohu Akbelkum National Desert Park
Jinghe Muttar National Desert Park
Hoboksar Janggar National Desert Park
Turpan Ayding Hu National Desert Park
Kuqa Qiuci National Desert Park
Yopurga Dawakol National Desert Park
Makit National Desert Park
Shache Karasu National Desert Park
Burqin Saruzun National Desert Park
Manas Tupaoying National Desert Park
Changji Beishawo National Desert Park
Hutubi Maqiaozi National Desert Park
Yengisar Sahan National Desert Park
Luntai Iminqek National Desert Park
Usu Ganjiahu National Desert Park
Shawan Tiemenkan National Desert Park
Yecheng Qaqkum National Desert Park
Xinjiang Production and Construction Corps
Tuolingmengpo National Desert Park
Aral Shuihuyang National Desert Park
Uluk National Desert Park
Zimuhe National Desert Park
Zuihuyang National Desert Park
Aral Kungang National Desert Park
Kokdala National Desert Park
Fengshengbu National Desert Park
Jinsitan National Desert Park, XPCC Seventh Division

Note 1: The above-mentioned "desert" generally refers to "sandy desert", unless otherwise noted.

Note 2: The above-mentioned "rocky desert" generally refers to "karst rocky desert", unless otherwise noted.

National Closed Sandified Land Protected Areas of China
Ratified by: State Forestry and Grassland Administration
Number of NCSLPAs: 102 (as at January 23, 2019)
Inner Mongolia
Qagan National Closed Sandified Land Protected Area, Xin Barag Left Banner
Olji Moron National Closed Sandified Land Protected Area, Jarud Banner
Weiliansu National Closed Sandified Land Protected Area, Naiman Banner
Songshushan National Closed Sandified Land Protected Area, Ongniud Banner
Wantaixing National Closed Sandified Land Protected Area, General Afforestation Station of Ordos City
Xar Tal National Closed Sandified Land Protected Area, Otog Banner
Dugui Tal National Closed Sandified Land Protected Area, Hanggin Banner
Shuangmiao National Closed Sandified Land Protected Area, Hanggin Banner
Hogq National Closed Sandified Land Protected Area, Urad Rear Banner
Ereh Hasah National Closed Sandified Land Protected Area, Alxa Left Banner
Mandal National Closed Sandified Land Protected Area, Alxa Right Banner
Ongt Gol National Closed Sandified Land Protected Area, Ejin Banner
Altan Qog National Closed Sandified Land Protected Area, Alxa Right Banner
Yabrai National Closed Sandified Land Protected Area, Alxa Right Banner
Jagt National Closed Sandified Land Protected Area, Alxa Left Banner
Gurnai National Closed Sandified Land Protected Area, Ejin Banner
Ih Us National Closed Sandified Land Protected Area, Hanggin Banner
Xine Us National Closed Sandified Land Protected Area, Urad Rear Banner
Sanggin Dalai National Closed Sandified Land Protected Area, Zhenglan Banner
Tibet
Nianjiusang National Closed Sandified Land Protected Area, Gar County
Lingtangqêmo National Closed Sandified Land Protected Area, Dinggyê County
Gaqoi National Closed Sandified Land Protected Area, Zhongba County
Nankor National Closed Sandified Land Protected Area, Sa'gya County
Shaanxi
National Closed Sandified Land Protected Area along Great Wall, Jingbian County
Heigeda Huanghusha National Closed Sandified Land Protected Area, Hengshan District
Wushilisha National Closed Sandified Land Protected Area, Yuyang District
National Closed Sandified Land Protected Area in Windblown Sandy Lakeshore Shrublands of Northern Dingbian County
Gansu
Mingshashan National Closed Sandified Land Protected Area, Dunhuang City
National Closed Sandified Land Protected Area on Western Edge of Badain Jaran Desert, Jinta County
National Closed Sandified Land Protected Area in Arid Desert of Northern Linze County
Dongtan National Closed Sandified Land Protected Area, Minle County
Suosuojing National Closed Sandified Land Protected Area, Minqin County
National Closed Sandified Land Protected Area in Northern Portion of Qinghe Oasis, Yongchang County
Hongliuquan National Closed Sandified Land Protected Area, Yumen City
National Closed Sandified Land Protected Area on Western Edge of Tengger Desert, Jinchuan District
Jiacaotan National Closed Sandified Land Protected Area, Liangzhou District
Mahuangtang National Closed Sandified Land Protected Area, Gulang County
Cuiliugou National Closed Sandified Land Protected Area, Jingtai County
Tianshui Town National Closed Sandified Land Protected Area, Huanxian
Dong Gobi National Closed Sandified Land Protected Area, Dunhuang City
Nganggarbo National Closed Sandified Land Protected Area, Maqu County
Dongle Nantan National Closed Sandified Land Protected Area, Shandan County
Mazongshan Town National Closed Sandified Land Protected Area, Subei County
Shiliangzi National Closed Sandified Land Protected Area, Jinta County
Xishawo National Closed Sandified Land Protected Area, Gaotai County
Kumtag National Closed Sandified Land Protected Area, Aksay County
Shangbalangjing National Closed Sandified Land Protected Area, Minqin County
Qinghai
Xarag National Closed Sandified Land Protected Area, Dulan County
Bulanggir National Closed Sandified Land Protected Area, Ulan County
Mangnai Administrative Committee National Closed Sandified Land Protected Area, Haixi Prefecture
Mogê Tan National Closed Sandified Land Protected Area, Guinan County
Da Qaidam Administrative Committee National Closed Sandified Land Protected Area
Urt Moron National Closed Sandified Land Protected Area, Golmud City
Haiyan County National Closed Sandified Land Protected Area
Tal Tan National Closed Sandified Land Protected Area, Gonghe County
Lucang National Closed Sandified Land Protected Area, Guinan County
Lenghu Administrative Committee National Closed Sandified Land Protected Area, Haixi Prefecture
Changmahe National Closed Sandified Land Protected Area, Maqên County  (alt. Qamalung)
Zaohuo National Closed Sandified Land Protected Area, Ulan County
Ningxia
Baijitan Sandbreak Forest Farm National Closed Sandified Land Protected Area, Lingwu City
Suanzaoliang National Closed Sandified Land Protected Area, Hongsibu District
Magaozhuang Township National Closed Sandified Land Protected Area, Tongxin County
Changliushui National Closed Sandified Land Protected Area, Shapotou District, Zhongwei City
Yanchi Mechanized Forest Farm National Closed Sandified Land Protected Area
Xinjiang
Gezkum National Closed Sandified Land Protected Area, Xayar County
National Closed Sandified Land Protected Area in Southern Nanhu Township of Hami City
National Closed Sandified Land Protected Area in Northwestern Kawak Township of Moyu County
Hedong National Closed Sandified Land Protected Area, Qiemo County
Liushe National Closed Sandified Land Protected Area, Manas County
Kumtag National Closed Sandified Land Protected Area, Shanshan County
Route S239 National Closed Sandified Land Protected Area, Jimsar County (S239: a provincial-level road)
Hotan Qiao National Closed Sandified Land Protected Area, Awat County
National Closed Sandified Land Protected Area on Northern Edge of Oasis in Yopurga County
Kumtobay National Closed Sandified Land Protected Area, Jeminay County
Qira Township National Closed Sandified Land Protected Area, Qira County
National Closed Sandified Land Protected Area at Luobuzhuang Section of National Highway 218, Ruoqiang County 
Akbelkum National Closed Sandified Land Protected Area, Bohu County
Mingshashan National Closed Sandified Land Protected Area, Mori Kazak Autonomous County
National Closed Sandified Land Protected Area in Northern Hanggiya Town of Lop County
Buguram National Closed Sandified Land Protected Area, Yengisar County
Sarkum National Closed Sandified Land Protected Area, Burqin County
Xiahe Linchang National Closed Sandified Land Protected Area, Bachu County
Sankouquan National Closed Sandified Land Protected Area, Fuhai County
Cainan National Closed Sandified Land Protected Area, Fukang City
Koktet National Closed Sandified Land Protected Area, Jiashi County
Kumbulag National Closed Sandified Land Protected Area, Hoxud County
Beishawo National Closed Sandified Land Protected Area, Hutubi County
Tinsk National Closed Sandified Land Protected Area, Jeminay County
National Closed Sandified Land Protected Area in South of Tarim Region, Kuqa County
Caohu Township National Closed Sandified Land Protected Area, Luntai County
Karangur Tograk National Closed Sandified Land Protected Area, Makit County
Niya Township National Closed Sandified Land Protected Area, Minfeng County
Kokterak Township National Closed Sandified Land Protected Area, Pishan County
Xidi National Closed Sandified Land Protected Area, Qitai County
Donghu National Closed Sandified Land Protected Area, Shanshan County
Aqqik National Closed Sandified Land Protected Area, Yuli County
Aqyar Town National Closed Sandified Land Protected Area, Wushi County
Daryaboyi Township National Closed Sandified Land Protected Area, Yutian County
Karasu Township National Closed Sandified Land Protected Area, Shache County
Janggilieski National Closed Sandified Land Protected Area, Yecheng County
Qowok National Closed Sandified Land Protected Area, Aksu City
Qikbulung National Closed Sandified Land Protected Area, Kalpin County

National Special Marine Protected Areas (Marine Parks) of China
Ratified by: State Forestry and Grassland Administration
Number of NSMPAs (unit): 71 (incl. 48 MPs, as at December 26, 2016)
Area of NSMPAs (incl. MPs) (10,000 km2): 0.4349 (as of 2012)
Total Number of SMPAs (unit): 111 (incl. MPs, as of 2019)
Area of SMPAs (incl. MPs) (10,000 km2): 7.15
Tianjin
Binhai National Marine Park
Hebei
Beidaihe National Marine Park
Liaoning
Jinzhou Dabijiashan National Special Marine Protected Area (National Marine Park) +1

Liaohekou Honghaitan National Marine Park
Suizhong Jieshi National Marine Park
Juehuadao National Marine Park
Dalian Changshan Qundao National Marine Park
Dalian Jinshitan National Marine Park
Tuanshan National Marine Park
Dalian Xianyuwan National Marine Park
Dalian Xinghaiwan National Marine Park
Linghai Dalinghekou National Marine Park
Shanghai
Jinshan National Marine Park
Jiangsu
Lianyungang Haizhouwan Bay Ecosystem and Natural Relic National Special Marine Protected Area +2

Haimen Liyashan National Marine Park
Lianyungang Haizhouwan National Marine Park +2 
Xiaoyangkou National Marine Park
Zhejiang
Yueqing Ximendao National Special Marine Protected Area
Shengsi Ma'an Liedao National Special Marine Protected Area +3
Putuo Zhongjieshan Liedao National Special Marine Protected Area +4
Yushan Liedao National Special Marine Protected Area (National Marine Park) +5

Dongtou National Marine Park
Shengsi National Marine Park +3
Yuhuan National Marine Park
Ningbo Xiangshan Hua'aodao National Marine Park
Putuo National Marine Park +4
Fujian
Xiamen National Marine Park
Fuyao Liedao National Marine Park
Changle National Marine Park
Meizhoudao National Marine Park
Chengzhoudao National Marine Park
Chongwu National Marine Park
Haitanwan National Marine Park, Pingtan Comprehensive Experimental Zone
Shandong
Changyi National Special Marine Eco-Protected Area
Dongying Huanghekou Ecosystem National Special Marine Protected Area
Dongying Lijin Demersal Fishes Ecosystem National Special Marine Protected Area
Dongying Hekou Shallow-water Shellfishes Ecosystem National Special Marine Protected Area
Dongying Laizhouwan Solenoidea Ecosystem National Special Marine Protected Area (protected targets:  Cultellus attenuatus, Solen grandis, Sinonovacula constricta and their habitats)
Dongying Guangrao Sandworms Ecosystem National Special Marine Protected Area
Wendeng Ocean Ecosystem National Special Marine Protected Area
Longkou Huangshuihekou Ocean Ecosystem National Special Marine Protected Area
Weihai Liugongdao Ocean Ecosystem National Special Marine Protected Area +i
Yantai Zhifudao Island Group National Special Marine Protected Area
Rushan Tadaowan Ocean Ecosystem National Special Marine Protected Area
Yantai Muping Sandy Coast National Special Marine Protected Area
Laiyang Wulonghekou Littoral Wetland National Special Marine Protected Area
Haiyang Wanmi Haitan Ocean Resources National Special Marine Protected Area
Weihai Xiaoshidao National Special Marine Protected Area
Laizhou Qiantan Ocean Ecosystem National Special Marine Protected Area  (alt. Laizhou Shoal)
Penglai Dengzhou Qiantan National Special Marine Protected Area   (alt. Dengzhou Shoal)

Weihai Liugongdao National Marine Park +i
Rizhao National Marine Park
Darushan National Marine Park
Changdao National Marine Park
Qingdao Xihai'an National Marine Park
Yantaishan National Marine Park
Penglai National Marine Park
Zhaoyuan Sandy Gold Coast National Marine Park
Weihai Haixitou National Marine Park
Yantai Laishan National Marine Park
Qingdao Jiaozhouwan National Marine Park
Guangdong
Hailingdao National Marine Park
Techengdao National Mainre Park
Leizhou Wushi National Marine Park
Nan'ao Qing'aowan National Marine Park
Yangxi Yueliangwan National Marine Park
Honghaiwan Zhelang Bandao National Marine Park
Guangxi
Qinzhou Maoweihai National Marine Park
Weizhoudao Coral Reef National Marine Park
Hainan
Wanning Laoyehai National Marine Park
Changjiang Qiziwan National Marine Park

+1/+2/+3/+4/+5: one identical institution under two different names.

+i: partially overlapped.

National Aquatic Germplasm Resources Conservation Areas of China
Ratified by: Ministry of Agriculture
Number of NAGRCAs (unit): 535 (as at October 31, 2017)
Total Number of AGRCAs (unit): TBV
Hebei
Fuping Chinese Softshell Turtle National Aquatic Germplasm Resources Conservation Area [Pelodiscus sinensis]
Hengshuihu National Aquatic Germplasm Resources Conservation Area
Baiyangdian National Aquatic Germplasm Resources Conservation Area
Qinhuangdao Waters National Aquatic Germplasm Resources Conservation Area
Changli Waters National Aquatic Germplasm Resources Conservation Area
Nandaihe Waters National Aquatic Germplasm Resources Conservation Area
Nandagang National Aquatic Germplasm Resources Conservation Area
Luanhe Endemic Fishes National Aquatic Germplasm Resources Conservation Area
Liuhe Endemic Fishes National Aquatic Germplasm Resources Conservation Area
Baipohu Endemic Fishes National Aquatic Germplasm Resources Conservation Area
Shazhanghe Redfin Culter and Oriental River Prawn National Aquatic Germplasm Resources Conservation Area [Chanodichthys erythropterus]-[Macrobrachium nipponense]
Yongnianwa Asian Swamp Eel and Pond Loach National Aquatic Germplasm Resources Conservation Area [Monopterus albus]-[Misgurnus anguillicaudatus]
Shanhaiguan Waters National Aquatic Germplasm Resources Conservation Area
Yongdinghe Chinese Softshell Turtle, Oriental River Prawn and Yellow Catfish National Aquatic Germplasm Resources Conservation Area [Tachysurus fulvidraco]
Guyuan Shandianhe Drainage System Bashang High-back Wild Goldfish National Aquatic Germplasm Resources Conservation Area [Carassius auratus var. Bashang high-back type]
Qianxi Lixianghu Reddish Dark Brown Carp and Yellow Catfish National Aquatic Germplasm Resources Conservation Area [Cyprinus rubrofuscus]
Caofeidian Chinese Mitten Crab National Aquatic Germplasm Resources Conservation Area [Eriocheir sinensis]
Xiangyundao Waters National Aquatic Germplasm Resources Conservation Area
Shijiazhuang Zhongshanhu Oriental River Prawn and Yellow Catfish National Aquatic Germplasm Resources Conservation Area
Shanxi
Shengtianhu Chinese Catfish and Huanghe Carp National Aquatic Germplasm Resources Conservation Area [Silurus asotus]-[Cyprinus rubrofuscus var. Huanghe]
Qinhe Endemic Fishes National Aquatic Germplasm Resources Conservation Area
National Aquatic Germplasm Resources Conservation Area at Yumenkou to Sanmenxia Section of Middle Yellow River (trans-provincial NAGRCA, shared with Henan and Shaanxi)
Inner Mongolia
Lanzhou Catfish National Aquatic Germplasm Resources Conservation Area at Ordos Section of Yellow River [Silurus lanzhouensis]
Taimen National Aquatic Germplasm Resources Conservation Area at Genhe Section of Ergun River [Hucho taimen]
Hulunhu Redfin Culter National Aquatic Germplasm Resources Conservation Area
Dal Nur Amur Ide National Aquatic Germplasm Resources Conservation Area [Leuciscus waleckii] 
Hureet Hu National Aquatic Germplasm Resources Conservation Area
Ganhe Taimen and Lenok National Aquatic Germplasm Resources Conservation Area [Brachymystax lenok]
Holin He Yellow Catfish National Aquatic Germplasm Resources Conservation Area
Taimen and Lenok National Aquatic Germplasm Resources Conservation Area at Zalantun City Section of Chaor River
Dayanhe National Aquatic Germplasm Resources Conservation Area
Liaoning
Shuangtaizihekou Jellyfish Haizhe and Chinese Mitten Crab National Aquatic Germplasm Resources Conservation Area [Rhopilema esculentum]
Sanshandao Waters National Aquatic Germplasm Resources Conservation Area
Haiyangdao National Aquatic Germplasm Resources Conservation Area
Dalian Yuandao Waters National Aquatic Germplasm Resources Conservation Area
Dalian Zhangzidao Waters National Aquatic Germplasm Resources Conservation Area
Dalian Yuyanjiao Waters National Aquatic Germplasm Resources Conservation Area
Hunheyuan Lenok National Aquatic Germplasm Resources Conservation Area
Jilin
Mijianghe Chum Salmon National Aquatic Germplasm Resources Conservation Area  [Oncorhynchus keta]
Korean Taimen National Aquatic Germplasm Resources Conservation Area at Ji'an Section of Yalu River [Hucho ishikawae]
Ussuri Catfish National Aquatic Germplasm Resources Conservation Area at Da'an Section of River Nenjiang [Pelteobagrus ussuriensis]
Siniperca scherzeri et Thymallus yaluensis National Aquatic Germplasm Resources Conservation Area at Yunfeng Section of Yalu River (Siniperca scherzeri: leopard mandarin fish)
Blackspotted Pike National Aquatic Germplasm Resources Conservation Area at Upper Mudan River [Esox reicherti]
Hunchunhe Chum Salmon National Aquatic Germplasm Resources Conservation Area
Songhuajiang Toudaojiang Endemic Fishes National Aquatic Germplasm Resources Conservation Area
Songhuajiang Ningjiang Section National Aquatic Germplasm Resources Conservation Area
Erlonghu National Aquatic Germplasm Resources Conservation Area
Xibeichahe Endemic Fishes National Aquatic Germplasm Resources Conservation Area
Nenjiang Zhenlai Section National Aquatic Germplasm Resources Conservation Area
Xiaoshihe Coldwater Fishes National Aquatic Germplasm Resources Conservation Area
Yuelianghu National Aquatic Germplasm Resources Conservation Area
Dahuangnihe Barbel Steed National Aquatic Germplasm Resources Conservation Area [Hemibarbus labeo]
Hanihe Korean Lamprey National Aquatic Germplasm Resources Conservation Area [Eudontomyzon morii]
Chinese Hooksnout Carp National Aquatic Germplasm Resources Conservation Area at Linjiang Section of Yalu River [Opsariichthys bidens]
Songyuan Songhuajiang Yellowfin National Aquatic Germplasm Resources Conservation Area [Xenocypris macrolepis]
Zhu'erduohe Amur Minnow National Aquatic Germplasm Resources Conservation Area [Rhynchocypris lagowskii]
Helong Hongqihe Masu Salmon Landlocked Type National Aquatic Germplasm Resources Conservation Area [Oncorhynchus masou]
Tonghua Hanihe National Aquatic Germplasm Resources Conservation Area
Nenjiang Qian Gorlos Section National Aquatic Germplasm Resources Conservation Area
Huinan Huifahe Amur Ide National Aquatic Germplasm Resources Conservation Area 
Baijianghe Endemic Fishes National Aquatic Germplasm Resources Conservation Area
Northern Lampreys National Aquatic Germplasm Resources Conservation Area at Jilin Section of Songhua River [Petromyzontid lampreys genus Lethenteron, incl. Arctic and Far Eastern brook lampreys]
Qian Gorlos Qagan Hu Mongolian Redfin National Aquatic Germplasm Resources Conservation Area [Chanodichthys mongolicus]
Qian Gorlos Xinmiaopao Endemic Fishes National Aquatic Germplasm Resources Conservation Area
Songhuahu Endemic Fishes National Aquatic Germplasm Resources Conservation Area
Jilin Jinjiang Endemic Fishes National Aquatic Germplasm Resources Conservation Area
Heilongjiang
Amur Whitefish National Aquatic Germplasm Resources Conservation Area at Luobei Section of Heilong River [Coregonus ussuriensis]
Panguhe Lenok and Burbot National Aquatic Germplasm Resources Conservation Area [Lota lota]
Blackspotted Pike and Amur Ide National Aquatic Germplasm Resources Conservation Area at Jiayin Section of Heilong River 
Songhuajiang Ussuri Catfish and Smallscale Yellowfin National Aquatic Germplasm Resources Conservation Area [Plagiognathops microlepis]
Heilongjiang Lijiadao Topmouth Culter National Aquatic Germplasm Resources Conservation Area [Culter alburnus]
Heilongjiang Humawan Endemic Fishes National Aquatic Germplasm Resources Conservation Area
Hailanghe Endemic Fishes National Aquatic Germplasm Resources Conservation Area
Songhuajiang Zhaodong Section National Aquatic Germplasm Resources Conservation Area
Heilongjiang Tongjiang Section National Aquatic Germplasm Resources Conservation Area
Songhuajiang Mulan Section National Aquatic Germplasm Resources Conservation Area
Heilongjiang Xunke Section National Aquatic Germplasm Resources Conservation Area
Amur Sturgeon and Kaluga National Aquatic Germplasm Resources Conservation Area at Fuyuan Section of Heilong River [Acipenser schrenckii]-[Huso dauricus]
Pacific Redfin and Pacific Salmons National Aquatic Germplasm Resources Conservation Area at Dongning Section of Suifen River [Tribolodon brandtii, incl. 3 migrating groups with gold, silver and black variations in skin color]-[Salmonid fishes genus Oncorhynchus, incl. chum, masu and humpback salmons] 
Mangniuhe National Aquatic Germplasm Resources Conservation Area
Nenjiang Woduhe Amur Grayling and Taimen National Aquatic Germplasm Resources Conservation Area [Thymallus grubii]
Spotted Steed National Aquatic Germplasm Resources Conservation Area at Zhaoyuan Section of Songhua River [Hemibarbus maculatus]
Mandarin Fish and Yellowfin National Aquatic Germplasm Resources Conservation Area at Shuangcheng Section of Songhua River [Siniperca chuatsi]
Xingkaihu Topmouth Culter National Aquatic Germplasm Resources Conservation Area
Taimen and White Amur Bream National Aquatic Germplasm Resources Conservation Area at Sipai Section of Wusuli River [Parabramis pekinensis]
Huangnihe Fangzheng Prussian Carp National Aquatic Germplasm Resources Conservation Area [Carassius gibelio var. Fangzheng]
Fabielahe Mandarin Fish National Aquatic Germplasm Resources Conservation Area
Kaluga National Aquatic Germplasm Resources Conservation Area at Tongjiang Section of Heilong River 
Ougenhe Blackspotted Pike National Aquatic Germplasm Resources Conservation Area
Nenjiang Songhuajiang Sanchaheko Silver Carp and Topmouth Culter National Aquatic Germplasm Resources Conservation Area [Hypophthalmichthys molitrix]
Wusulijiang (Hulin Section) Endemic Fishes National Aquatic Germplasm Resources Conservation Area
Shanghai
Changjiang Japanese Grenadier Anchovy National Aquatic Germplasm Resources Conservation Area [Coilia nasus] (trans-provincial NAGRCA, shared with Jiangsu and Anhui)
Jiangsu
Haizhouwan Fleshy Prawn National Aquatic Germplasm Resources Conservation Area [Penaeus chinensis]
Taihu Icefishes, Topmouth Culter and Siberian Prawn National Aquatic Germplasm Resources Conservation Area, Lake Taihu [Salangids genera Neosalanx & Protosalanx]-[Exopalaemon modestus]
Hongzehu Oriental River Prawn and Asian Clam National Aquatic Germplasm Resources Conservation Area [Corbicula fluminea]
Yangchenghu Chinese Mitten Crab National Aquatic Germplasm Resources Conservation Area
Chinese Mitten Crab and Mandarin Fish National Aquatic Germplasm Resources Conservation Area at Jingjiang Section of Yangtze River 
Jiangjiasha Zhugensha Korean Mud Snail and Asiatic Hard Clam National Aquatic Germplasm Resources Conservation Area [Bullacta exarata]-[Meretrix meretrix]
Changjiang Dashengguan Chinese Longsnout Catfish and Bronze Gudgeon National Aquatic Germplasm Resources Conservation Area [Leiocassis longirostris]-[Coreius heterodon]
Guchenghu Chinese Mitten Crab National Aquatic Germplasm Resources Conservation Area
Gaoyouhu Clearhead Icefish and Lake Anchovy National Aquatic Germplasm Resources Conservation Area [Protosalanx hyalocranius]-[Coilia nasus taihuensis]
"Four Major Domestic Carps" National Aquatic Germplasm Resources Conservation Area at Yangzhou Section of Yangtze River [Cyprinids genera Mylopharyngodon, Ctenopharyngodon & Hypophthalmichthys, incl. black, grass, silver and bighead carps]
Baimahu Pond Loach and Dark Sleeper National Aquatic Germplasm Resources Conservation Area [Odontobutis obscura]
Luomahu National Aquatic Germplasm Resources Conservation Area
Gehu National Aquatic Germplasm Resources Conservation Area
Changdanghu National Aquatic Germplasm Resources Conservation Area
Shaobohu National Aquatic Germplasm Resources Conservation Area
Changyanghu National Aquatic Germplasm Resources Conservation Area
Sheyanghu National Aquatic Germplasm Resources Conservation Area
Baoyinghu National Aquatic Germplasm Resources Conservation Area
Japanese Grenadier Anchovy National Aquatic Germplasm Resources Conservation Area at Rugao Section of Yangtze River 
Taihu Oriental River Prawn and Chinese Mitten Crab National Aquatic Germplasm Resources Conservation Area
Rudong Grand Razor Shell and Antique Mactra National Aquatic Germplasm Resources Conservation Area [Solen grandis]-[Mactra antiquata]
Hongzehu Icefishes National Aquatic Germplasm Resources Conservation Area
Luomahu Oriental River Prawn National Aquatic Germplasm Resources Conservation Area
Taihu Lake Anchovy and Asian Clam National Aquatic Germplasm Resources Conservation Area
Dianshanhu Asian Clam and Tommouth Culter National Aquatic Germplasm Resources Conservation Area
Changjiang Japanese Grenadier Anchovy National Aquatic Germplasm Resources Conservation Area (trans-provincial NAGRCA, shared with Shanghai and Anhui)
Gehu Cultrinae Fishes National Aquatic Germplasm Resources Conservation Area [Cyprinids genera Culter & Chanodichthys, incl. topmouth culter, Mongolian redfin and "humpback"]
Gaoyouhu Asian Clam and Siberian Prawn National Aquatic Germplasm Resources Conservation Area
Obscure Pufferfish and Japanese Grenadier Anchovy National Aquatic Germplasm Resources Conservation Area at Yangzhong Section of Yangtze River [Takifugu obscurus]
Yixing Tuanjiu Dongjiu Topmouth Culter National Aquatic Germplasm Resources Conservation Area
Hongzehu Palaemonid Prawns National Aquatic Germplasm Resources Conservation Area [subfamily Palaemoninae, incl. Siberian and Oriental river prawns]
Hongzehu Mandarin Fish National Aquatic Germplasm Resources Conservation Area
Jinshahu Yellow Catfish National Aquatic Germplasm Resources Conservation Area
Gaoyouhu Oriental River Prawn National Aquatic Germplasm Resources Conservation Area
Hongzehu Yellow Catfish National Aquatic Germplasm Resources Conservation Area
Zhejiang
Yueqingwan Granular Ark National Aquatic Germplasm Resources Conservation Area [Tegillarca granosa]
Qiandaohu National Aquatic Germplasm Resources Conservation Area
Dong- Xi-tiaoxi National Aquatic Germplasm Resources Conservation Area
Xiangshangang Japanese Spanish Mackerel National Aquatic Germplasm Resources Conservation Area [Scomberomorus niphonius]
Qingyuan Chinese Giant Salamander National Aquatic Germplasm Resources Conservation Area [Andrias davidianus]
Anhui
Bohu Siberian Prawn and Oriental River Prawn National Aquatic Germplasm Resources Conservation Area
Chinese Longsnout Catfish, Chinese Large-mouth Catfish and Mandarin Fish National Aquatic Germplasm Resources Conservation Area at Anqing Section of Yangtze River [Silurus meridionalis]
Wuchanghu Chinese Softshell Turtle and Asian Swamp Eel National Aquatic Germplasm Resources Conservation Area
Poganghu Yellow Catfish National Aquatic Germplasm Resources Conservation Area 
Jiaoganghu Foxnut National Aquatic Germplasm Resources Conservation Area [Euryale ferox]
Huishuihe Endemic Fishes National Aquatic Germplasm Resources Conservation Area
"Four Major Domestic Carps" National Aquatic Germplasm Resources Conservation Area at Anqing Section of Yangtze River
Changjiang Endemic Fishes National Aquatic Germplasm Resources Conservation Area
Chengxihu National Aquatic Germplasm Resources Conservation Area
Qiupuhe Endemic Fishes National Aquatic Germplasm Resources Conservation Area
Chengdonghu National Aquatic Germplasm Resources Conservation Area
Xizihu National Aquatic Germplasm Resources Conservation Area
Wanfohu National Aquatic Germplasm Resources Conservation Area
Chinese Longsnout Catfish National Aquatic Germplasm Resources Conservation Area at Huainan Section of River Huaihe
Qinglonghu Spinibarbus caldwelli National Aquatic Germplasm Resources Conservation Area
Longwohu Smallscale Yellowfin National Aquatic Germplasm Resources Conservation Area
Chihe Topmouth Culter National Aquatic Germplasm Resources Conservation Area
Changjianghe Freshwater Minnow and Chinese Hooksnout Carp National Aquatic Germplasm Resources Conservation Area [Zacco platypus]
Huaihong Xinhe Neosalanx taihuensis National Aquatic Germplasm Resources Conservation Area 
Changjiang Japanese Grenadier Anchovy National Aquatic Germplasm Resources Conservation Area (trans-provincial NAGRCA, shared with Shanghai and Jiangsu)
Manshuihe Mongolian Redfin National Aquatic Germplasm Resources Conservation Area 
Dengyuanhe Endemic Fishes National Aquatic Germplasm Resources Conservation Area
Huangguhe Cyprinids genera Acrossocheilus and Onychostoma National Aquatic Germplasm Resources Conservation Area (incl.  Acrossocheilus wenchowensis, Acrossocheilus hemispinus, Acrossocheilus parallens & Onychostoma elongatum)
Huaihe Jingtuxia Reddish Dark Brown Carp and Chinese Longsnout Catfish National Aquatic Germplasm Resources Conservation Area
Huangpenhe Gobies and Oriental River Prawn National Aquatic Germplasm Resources Conservation Area [Gobiid fishes genus Rhinogobius, incl. Rhinogobius giurinus & Rhinogobius cliffordpopei]
Huatinghu David's Yellowfin National Aquatic Germplasm Resources Conservation Area [Xenocypris davidi]
Solenia oleivora National Aquatic Germplasm Resources Conservation Area at Fuyang Section of River Huaihe
Rhynchocypris oxycephalus, Acrossocheilus fasciatus et Zacco platypus National Aquatic Germplasm Resources Conservation Area at Shexian Section of Xin'an River (Rhynchocypris oxycephalus: Chinese minnow; Zacco platypus: freshwater minnow)
Huanghe Carp National Aquatic Germplasm Resources Conservation Area at Dangshan Section of Abandoned Yellow River
Fujian
Guanjingyang Large Yellow Croaker National Aquatic Germplasm Resources Conservation Area [Pseudosciaena crocea]
Xixi Chinese Softshell Turtle National Aquatic Germplasm Resources Conservation Area
Zhanggang Antique Mactra National Aquatic Germplasm Resources Conservation Area 
Tingjiang Zig-zag Eel National Aquatic Germplasm Resources Conservation Area [Mastacembelus armatus]
Jiuquxi Spinibarbus caldwelli National Aquatic Germplasm Resources Conservation Area
Huyangxi Spinibarbus caldwelli National Aquatic Germplasm Resources Conservation Area
Luokouxi David's Yellowfin National Aquatic Germplasm Resources Conservation Area 
Jianxi Smallscale Yellowfin National Aquatic Germplasm Resources Conservation Area
Nanpuxi Acrossocheilus hemispinus National Aquatic Germplasm Resources Conservation Area
Songxihe Acrossocheilus paradoxus National Aquatic Germplasm Resources Conservation Area
Maxi Acrossocheilus hemispinus National Aquatic Germplasm Resources Conservation Area, Shunchang
Jiangxi
Poyanghu Mandarin Fish and Topmouth Culter National Aquatic Germplasm Resources Conservation Area
Taojiang Spinibarbus caldwelli National Aquatic Germplasm Resources Conservation Area
Lushanxihai Yellowcheek National Aquatic Germplasm Resources Conservation Area [Elopichthys bambusa]
Taipohu Pengze Wild-type Goldfish National Aquatic Germplasm Resources Conservation Area [Carassius auratus var. Pengze]
Luxihe Largefin Longbarbel Catfish National Aquatic Germplasm Resources Conservation Area [Hemibagrus macropterus]
Fuhe Mandarin Fish National Aquatic Germplasm Resources Conservation Area
Pingshuihe Endemic Fishes National Aquatic Germplasm Resources Conservation Area
Wannianhe Endemic Fishes National Aquatic Germplasm Resources Conservation Area
Huishui Endemic Fishes National Aquatic Germplasm Resources Conservation Area
Xinjiang Endemic Fishes National Aquatic Germplasm Resources Conservation Area
Dingjianghe Endemic Fishes National Aquatic Germplasm Resources Conservation Area
Endemic Fishes National Aquatic Germplasm Resources Conservation Area at Upper River Yuanhe
"Four Major Domestic Carps" National Aquatic Germplasm Resources Conservation Area at Xiajiang Section of River Ganjiang
Qinjiang Smallscale Yellowfin National Aquatic Germplasm Resources Conservation Area
Shangyoujiang Endemic Fishes National Aquatic Germplasm Resources Conservation Area
Dongjiangyuan Big-headed Turtle National Aquatic Germplasm Resources Conservation Area [Platysternon megacephalum]
Changjiang Spinibarbus caldwelli National Aquatic Germplasm Resources Conservation Area
Ganjiangyuan Blotched Snakehead National Aquatic Germplasm Resources Conservation Area [Channa maculata]
Xiushuiyuan Spinibarbus caldwelli National Aquatic Germplasm Resources Conservation Area
Boyanghe Topmouth Culter and Yellow Catfish National Aquatic Germplasm Resources Conservation Area, De'an
Changjiang Balijiang Section Chinese Longsnout Catfish and Chinese Catfish National Aquatic Germplasm Resources Conservation Area
"Four Major Domestic Carps" National Aquatic Germplasm Resources Conservation Area at Jiangxi Section of Yangtze River
Luxi Spiny Paa Frog National Aquatic Germplasm Resources Conservation Area [Quasipaa spinosa]
Triangle Sail Mussel National Aquatic Germplasm Resources Conservation Area at Lower River Xiuhe [Hyriopsis cumingii]
Spiny Paa Frog National Aquatic Germplasm Resources Conservation Area, Yihuang
Shandong
Kongtong Liedao Japanese Spiky Sea Cucumber National Aquatic Germplasm Resources Conservation Area [Apostichopus japonicus]
Nansihu Northern Snakehead and Oriental River Prawn National Aquatic Germplasm Resources Conservation Area [Channa argus]
Changdao Japanese Disc Abalone and Dalian Purple Urchin National Aquatic Germplasm Resources Conservation Area [Haliotis discus hannai]-[Mesocentrotus nudus]
Haizhouwan Grand Razor Shell National Aquatic Germplasm Resources Conservation Area
Laizhouwan Penis Fish and Suminoe Oyster National Aquatic Germplasm Resources Conservation Area  [Urechis unicinctus]- [Crassostrea rivularis]
Jinghaiwan Roughskin Sculpin National Aquatic Germplasm Resources Conservation Area [Trachidermus fasciatus]
Taishan Red-scaled Fish National Aquatic Germplasm Resources Conservation Area, Mount Taishan [Onychostoma macrolepis]
Majiahe Asiatic Hard Clam National Aquatic Germplasm Resources Conservation Area
Penglai Bastard Halibut and Marbled Flounder National Aquatic Germplasm Resources Conservation Area [Paralichthys olivaceus]-[Pseudopleuronectes yokohamae]
Huanghekou Half-smooth Tongue Sole National Aquatic Germplasm Resources Conservation Area [Cynoglossus semilaevis]
Lingshandao Japanese Disc Abalone and Japanese Spiky Sea Cucumber National Aquatic Germplasm Resources Conservation Area
Jingziwan National Aquatic Germplasm Resources Conservation Area
Rushanwan National Aquatic Germplasm Resources Conservation Area
Qiansandao Waters National Aquatic Germplasm Resources Conservation Area (Note that there is a dispute between the provinces of Shandong and Jiangsu over ownership of Qiansandao Islands)
Xiaoshidao Japanese Spiky Sea Cucumber National Aquatic Germplasm Resources Conservation Area
Sanggouwan National Aquatic Germplasm Resources Conservation Area
Rongchengwan National Aquatic Germplasm Resources Conservation Area
Tao'erhekou Waters National Aquatic Germplasm Resources Conservation Area
Qianliyan Waters National Aquatic Germplasm Resources Conservation Area
Antique Mactra National Aquatic Germplasm Resources Conservation Area at Rizhao Waters
Dongpinghu National Aquatic Germplasm Resources Conservation Area
Gould's Razor Shell National Aquatic Germplasm Resources Conservation Area at Guangrao Waters [Solen strictus]
Huanghekou Asiatic Hard Clam National Aquatic Germplasm Resources Conservation Area
Changdao Korean Rockfish National Aquatic Germplasm Resources Conservation Area [Sebastes schlegelii]
Wulonghe Carp National Aquatic Germplasm Resources Conservation Area, Wulong River [Cyprinus rubrofuscus var. Wulonghe]
Rongcheng Chudao Algae National Aquatic Germplasm Resources Conservation Area 
Rizhao Fleshy Prawn National Aquatic Germplasm Resources Conservation Area
Wudi Northern Mauxia Shrimp National Aquatic Germplasm Resources Conservation Area [Acetes chinensis]
Yuehu Whiparm Octopus National Aquatic Germplasm Resources Conservation Area [Octopus variabilis]
Sishui Peach Blossom Jellyfish National Aquatic Germplasm Resources Conservation Area [Craspedacusta sowerbii]
National Aquatic Germplasm Resources Conservation Area along Shandong-Henan Border Sector of Yellow River (trans-provincial NAGRCA, shared with Henan)
Tai'an David's Yellowfin National Aquatic Germplasm Resources Conservation Area
Deyuehu Spotted Steed and Topmouth Culter National Aquatic Germplasm Resources Conservation Area
Majiahe Topmouth Culter and Large-scale Loach National Aquatic Germplasm Resources Conservation [Paramisgurnus dabryanus]
Yunmenghu Clearhead Icefish National Aquatic Germplasm Resources Conservation Area
Yihe Carp and Oriental River Prawn National Aquatic Germplasm Resources Conservation Area, River Yihe [Cyprinus rubrofuscus var. Yihe]
Yellow Catfish National Aquatic Germplasm Resources Conservation Area at Tai'erzhuang Section of Beijing-Hangzhou Canal
Qingshuihe Asian Clam National Aquatic Germplasm Resources Conservation Area
Zihe Chinese Catfish National Aquatic Germplasm Resources Conservation Area
Wenchanghu Barbel Chub National Aquatic Germplasm Resources Conservation Area [Squaliobarbus curriculus]
Qingyanghe Black Amur Bream National Aquatic Germplasm Resources Conservation Area [Megalobrama terminalis]
Madahu Oriental River Prawn and Chinese Mitten Crab National Aquatic Germplasm Resources Conservation Area
Guangminghu Redfin Culter National Aquatic Germplasm Resources Conservation Area
Qingyunhu Neosalanx oligodontis National Aquatic Germplasm Resources Conservation Area
Yinan Wenhe Chinese Hooksnout Carp National Aquatic Germplasm Resources Conservation Area
Henan
Huanghe Carp National Aquatic Germplasm Resources Conservation Area at Zhengzhou Section of Yellow River
Qihe Wild-type Goldfish National Aquatic Germplasm Resources Conservation Area, River Qihe [Carassius auratus var. Qihe]
Guangshan Oriental River Prawn National Aquatic Germplasm Resources Conservation Area
Suyahu Cockscomb Pearl Mussel National Aquatic Germplasm Resources Conservation Area [Cristaria plicata]
Nanwanhu National Aquatic Germplasm Resources Conservation Area
Danjiang Endemic Fishes National Aquatic Germplasm Resources Conservation Area
Shahe Endemic Fishes National Aquatic Germplasm Resources Conservation Area
Pohe Endemic Fishes National Aquatic Germplasm Resources Conservation Area
Yihe Endemic Fishes National Aquatic Germplasm Resources Conservation Area
Luohe Huanghe Carp National Aquatic Germplasm Resources Conservation Area
Laoyahe Spotted Steed National Aquatic Germplasm Resources Conservation Area 
Yahekou Shuiku Mongolian Redfin National Aquatic Germplasm Resources Conservation Area 
National Aquatic Germplasm Resources Conservation Area at Yumenkou to Sanmenxia Section of Middle Yellow River (trans-provincial NAGRCA, shared with Shanxi and Shaanxi)
Xiaohuanghe Chinese Softshell Turtle National Aquatic Germplasm Resources Conservation Area
Ruhe Yellow Catfish National Aquatic Germplasm Resources Conservation Area, River Ruhe [Tachysurus fulvidraco var. Ruhe]
Qihe Wild-type Goldfish National Aquatic Germplasm Resources Conservation Area at Hebi Section of River Qihe
National Aquatic Germplasm Resources Conservation Area along Shandong-Henan Border Sector of Yellow River (trans-provincial NAGRCA, shared with Shandong)
Banqiaohu National Aquatic Germplasm Resources Conservation Area
Luohe Lihe Oriental River Prawn National Aquatic Germplasm Resources Conservation Area
Ussuri Catfish and Amur Ide National Aquatic Germplasm Resources Conservation Area at Luoning Section of River Luohe 
Hubei
Liangzihu Wuchang Bream National Aquatic Germplasm Resources Conservation Area [Megalobrama amblycephala]
Xilianghu Mandarin Fish and Yellow Catfish National Aquatic Germplasm Resources Conservation Area 
Yunihu Wuchang Bream National Aquatic Germplasm Resources Conservation Area
Changhu Cultrinae Fishes National Aquatic Germplasm Resources Conservation Area [Cyprinids genera Culter & Chanodichthys, incl. Culter alburnus, Chanodichthys mongolicus, Chanodichthys dabryi, Culter oxycephaloides & Chanodichthys erythropterus]
"Four Major Domestic Carps" National Aquatic Germplasm Resources Conservation Area at Huangshi Section of Yangtze River
Chinese Longsnout Catfish and Darkbarbel Catfish National Aquatic Germplasm Resources Conservation Area at Shayang Section of River Hanjiang [Pseudobagrus vachellii]
Elopichthys bambusa, Ochetobius elongatus et Luciobrama macrocephalus National Aquatic Germplasm Resources Conservation Area at Zhongxiang Section of River Hanjiang (Elopichthys bambusa: yellowcheek; Luciobrama macrocephalus: long Spiky-head Carp)
Taibaihu National Aquatic Germplasm Resources Conservation Area
"Four Major Domestic Carps" National Aquatic Germplasm Resources Conservation Area at Jianli Section of Yangtze River
Danjiang Cultrinae Fishes National Aquatic Germplasm Resources Conservation Area [Cyprinids genera Culter & Chanodichthys, incl. Culter alburnus, Chanodichthys mongolicus, Culter oxycephaloides & Chanodichthys erythropterus]
Pohe Endemic Fishes National Aquatic Germplasm Resources Conservation Area
Shangjinhu National Aquatic Germplasm Resources Conservation Area
Huamahu National Aquatic Germplasm Resources Conservation Area
Honghu National Aquatic Germplasm Resources Conservation Area
Hanjiang Hanchuan Section National Aquatic Germplasm Resources Conservation Area
Juzhanghe Endemic Fishes National Aquatic Germplasm Resources Conservation Area
Yuquanhe Endemic Fishes National Aquatic Germplasm Resources Conservation Area
Bao'anhu Mandarin Fish National Aquatic Germplasm Resources Conservation Area
Luhu Mandarin Fish and Cultrinae Fishes National Aquatic Germplasm Resources Conservation Area
Wuhu Asian Swamp Eel National Aquatic Germplasm Resources Conservation Area
Chidonghu White Amur Bream National Aquatic Germplasm Resources Conservation Area
Qingjiang Onychostoma simum National Aquatic Germplasm Resources Conservation Area
Huiting Shuiku Chinese Softshell Turtle National Aquatic Germplasm Resources Conservation Area
Wangmuhu Wuchang Bream and Yangtse Grenadier Anchovy National Aquatic Germplasm Resources Conservation Area [Coilia brachygnathus]
Wuhu Yellow Catfish National Aquatic Germplasm Resources Conservation Area
Guanyinhu Mandarin Fish National Aquatic Germplasm Resources Conservation Area
Hanbeihe Darkbarbel Catfish National Aquatic Germplasm Resources Conservation Area
Yangchaihu Dark Sleeper and Lesser Spiny Eel National Aquatic Germplasm Resources Conservation Area [Macrognathus aculeatus]
"Four Major Domestic Carps" National Aquatic Germplasm Resources Conservation Area at Qianjiang Section of River Hanjiang
Yunshui Topmouth Culter National Aquatic Germplasm Resources Conservation Area
Chonghu Yellow Catfish National Aquatic Germplasm Resources Conservation Area
Miaohu Topmouth Culter National Aquatic Germplasm Resources Conservation Area
Yezhuhu Cultrinae Fishes National Aquatic Germplasm Resources Conservation Area [Cyprinids genera Culter & Chanodichthys, incl. topmouth culter, Mongolian redfin and "humpback"]
Cehu Yellow Catfish and Northern Snakehead National Aquatic Germplasm Resources Conservation Area
Nanhaihu Yangtse Grenadier Anchovy National Aquatic Germplasm Resources Conservation Area 
Niulanghu Mandarin Fish National Aquatic Germplasm Resources Conservation Area
Zhupohu Spotted Steed National Aquatic Germplasm Resources Conservation Area
Fuhe Smallscale Yellowfin National Aquatic Germplasm Resources Conservation Area
Qianhe Chinese Catfish National Aquatic Germplasm Resources Conservation Area
Weishui Mandarin Fish National Aquatic Germplasm Resources Conservation Area
Wangjiahe Cultrinae Fishes National Aquatic Germplasm Resources Conservation Area [Cyprinids genera Culter & Chanodichthys, incl. Culter alburnus, Chanodichthys mongolicus & Culter oxycephaloides]
Duhe Mandarin Fish National Aquatic Germplasm Resources Conservation Area
Jinhuahu Spotted Steed National Aquatic Germplasm Resources Conservation Area
Wangjiadahu Lamprotula fibrosa National Aquatic Germplasm Resources Conservation Area 
Hongqihu Asian Swamp Eel and Yellow Catfish National Aquatic Germplasm Resources Conservation Area
Longtanhu Mongolian Redfin National Aquatic Germplasm Resources Conservation Area
Smallscale Yellowfin National Aquatic Germplasm Resources Conservation Area at Xianjuemiao on Tributary of River Piaoshui 
Longsaihu Smallscale Yellowfin and Topmouth Culter National Aquatic Germplasm Resources Conservation Area
Shatanhe Northern Snakehead National Aquatic Germplasm Resources Conservation Area
Wangtianhu Topmouth Culter National Aquatic Germplasm Resources Conservation Area
Tiantanghu Cultrinae Fishes National Aquatic Germplasm Resources Conservation Area [Cyprinids genera Culter & Chanodichthys, incl. topmouth culter, "humpback" and Mongolian redfin]
Shengshuihu Yellow Catfish National Aquatic Germplasm Resources Conservation Area
Pipahu Smallscale Yellowfin National Aquatic Germplasm Resources Conservation Area
Fushuihu Cultrinae Fishes National Aquatic Germplasm Resources Conservation Area
Jinshahu White Amur Bream National Aquatic Germplasm Resources Conservation Area
Yanzhihu Yellow Catfish National Aquatic Germplasm Resources Conservation Area
Dongganghu Asian Swamp Eel National Aquatic Germplasm Resources Conservation Area
Nanhu Yellow Catfish and Northern Snakehead National Aquatic Germplasm Resources Conservation Area
White Amur Bream National Aquatic Germplasm Resources at Xiangyang Section of River Hanjiang
Neosalanx pseudotaihuensis National Aquatic Germplasm Resources at Xujiahe Waters on Tributary of River Fuhe
Topmouth Culter National Aquatic Germplasm Resources Conservation Area at Yunyang Section of River Hanjiang
Spinibarbus sinensis National Aquatic Germplasm Resources Conservation Area at Yidu Section of River Qingjiang
Yaohe Pond Loach National Aquatic Germplasm Resources Conservation Area
Dafushuihe Leopard Mandarin Fish National Aquatic Germplasm Resources Conservation Area
Onychostoma macrolepis National Aquatic Germplasm Resources Conservation Area at Longbeiwan Section of River Duhe
 Topmouth Culter National Aquatic Germplasm Resources Conservation Area at Heiwuwan Section of Zhashui River
Hunan
Dongdongtinghu Reddish Dark Brown Carp, Wild-type Goldfish and Yellow Catfish National Aquatic Germplasm Resources Conservation Area [carassius auratus] 
Nandongtinghu Icefishes and Triangle Sail Mussel National Aquatic Germplasm Resources Conservation Area 
Xiangjiang Wild Carp National Aquatic Germplasm Resources Conservation Area at Xiangtan Section of River Xiangjiang [Cyprinus rubrofuscus var. Xiangjiang]
Nandongtinghu Chinese Large-mouth Catfish, Oriental River Prawn and Chinese Softshell Turtle National Aquatic Germplasm Resources Conservation Area
Nandongtinghu Reeves’ Turtle and Chinese Softshell Turtle National Aquatic Germplasm Resources Conservation Area [Mauremys reevesii]
Yuanshui Endemic Fishes National Aquatic Germplasm Resources Conservation Area
Lishuiyuan Endemic Fishes National Aquatic Germplasm Resources Conservation Area
"Four Major Domestic Carps" National Aquatic Germplasm Resources Conservation Area at Hengyang Section of River Xiangjiang
Liuyanghe Endemic Fishes National Aquatic Germplasm Resources Conservation Area
Dongtinghukou Bronze Gudgeon and Yangtse Grenadier Anchovy National Aquatic Germplasm Resources Conservation Area 
Xiangjiang Spinibarbus caldwelli, Acrossocheilus paradoxus et Sinibrama wui National Aquatic Germplasm Resources Conservation Area
Cultrinae Fishes and Yellow Catfish National Aquatic Germplasm Resources Conservation Area at Chenxi Section of River Yuanshui 
Cockscomb Pearl Mussel National Aquatic Germplasm Resources Conservation Area at Dingcheng Section of River Yuanshui
Dongdongtinghu Chinese Mystery Snail National Aquatic Germplasm Resources Conservation Area [Cipangopaludina chinensis]
Sinipercinae and Cultrinae Fishes National Aquatic Germplasm Resources Conservation Area at Xinhua Section of River Zishui (major protected targets: big-eye mandarin fish and topmouth culter; other protected species: mandarin fish, Mongolian redfin, etc.)
Xenocyprinae Fishes National Aquatic Germplasm Resources Conservation Area at Zhuzhou Section of River Xiangjiang
Leishui Blotched Snakehead National Aquatic Germplasm Resources Conservation Area 
Spinibarbus sinensis National Aquatic Germplasm Resources Conservation Area at Chaling Section of River Mishui
Yellow Catfish National Aquatic Germplasm Resources Conservation Area at Yiyang Section of River Zishui
Topmouth Culter National Aquatic Germplasm Resources Conservation Area at Xiangxi Section of River Youshui
David's Yellowfin National Aquatic Germplasm Resources Conservation Area at Shimen Section of River Lishui
Anxiang Yangjiahe Section Yangtse Grenadier Anchovy National Aquatic Germplasm Resources Conservation Area 
Yongshun Sichenghe Rhinogobio typus et Siniperca knerii National Aquatic Germplasm Resources Conservation Area (Siniperca knerii: big-eye mandarin fish)
Yellow Catfish and David's Yellowfin National Aquatic Germplasm Resources Conservation Area at Taoyuan Section of River Yuanshui
Oriental River Prawn and Chinese Softshell Turtle National Aquatic Germplasm Resources Conservation Area at Wuling Section of River Yuanshui
Zig-zag Eel and Chinese Barb National Aquatic Germplasm Resources Conservation Area at Zixing Section of River Zheshui [Barbodes semifasciolatus]
Longshan Xichehe Hemibagrus macropterus et Rhinogobio typus National Aquatic Germplasm Resources Conservation Area  (Hemibagrus macropterus: largefin longbarbel catfish)
Zijiang Youxihe Culter oxycephaloides et Chanodichthys mongolicus National Aquatic Germplasm Resources Conservation Area (Chanodichthys mongolicus: Mongolian redfin)
Chinese Large-mouth Catfish National Aquatic Germplasm Resources Conservation Area at Xiongjiahe Section of Lishui Floodway 
White Amur Bream and Largefin Longbarbel Catfish National Aquatic Germplasm Resources Conservation Area at Taohuayuan Section of River Yuanshui
Dark Sleeper and David's Yellowfin National Aquatic Germplasm Resources Conservation Area at Xinshao Section of Zijiang
Topmouth Culter National Aquatic Germplasm Resources Conservation Area at Anxiang Section of Hudu River
Yellow Catfish and David's Yellowfin National Aquatic Germplasm Resources Conservation Area at Linwu Section of Wushui River of River Beijiang
Chinese Catfish National Aquatic Germplasm Resources Conservation Area at Estuary Section of Miluo River
Spinibarbus caldwelli et Culter oxycephaloides National Aquatic Germplasm Resources Conservation Area at Shuangpai Section of River Xiaoshui of River Xiangjiang
Leopard Mandarin Fish and Yellow Catfish National Aquatic Germplasm Resources Conservation Area at Pingjiang Section of Miluo River
Guangdong
Xijiang Black Amur Bream National Aquatic Germplasm Resources Conservation Area 
Shang- Xia-chuandao Chinese Spiny Lobster National Aquatic Germplasm Resources Conservation Area [Panulirus stimpsoni]
Shikuhe Spotted Longbarbel Catfish National Aquatic Germplasm Resources Conservation Area [Hemibagrus guttatus]
Liuxihe Spinibarbus caldwelli National Aquatic Germplasm Resources Conservation Area
Zengjiang Spinibarbus caldwelli et Mastacembelus armatus National Aquatic Germplasm Resources Conservation Area (Mastacembelus armatus: zig-zag eel)
Hailingwan Suminoe Oyster National Aquatic Germplasm Resources Conservation Area
Xijiang Barbel Chub and Hainan Culter National Aquatic Germplasm Resources Conservation Area [Culter recurviceps]
Xijiang Zhaoqing Section National Aquatic Germplasm Resources Conservation Area
Beijiang Yingde Section National Aquatic Germplasm Resources Conservation Area
Rongjiang Endemic Fishes National Aquatic Germplasm Resources Conservation Area
Lingjiang Endemic Fishes National Aquatic Germplasm Resources Conservation Area
Xinfengjiang National Aquatic Germplasm Resources Conservation Area
Jianjiangkou Soletellina acuta National Aquatic Germplasm Resources Conservation Area
Tanjiang Black Amur Bream National Aquatic Germplasm Resources Conservation Area
Shanwei Jieshiwan Flathead Grey Mullet and Redtail Prawn National Aquatic Germplasm Resources Conservation Area [Mugil cephalus]-[Penaeus penicillatus]
Youshuhe Blotched Snakehead National Aquatic Germplasm Resources Conservation Area
Lijiang Zig-zag Eel and Yellow Catfish National Aquatic Germplasm Resources Conservation Area
Guangxi
Lijiang Spinibarbus caldwelli et Sinocyclocheilus guilinensis National Aquatic Germplasm Resources Conservation Area (Sinocyclocheilus guilinensis: Guilin golden-line barbel)
Xijiang Wuzhou Section National Aquatic Germplasm Resources Conservation Area
Liujiang Cranoglanis bouderius, Bangana decora et Hemitrygon akajei National Aquatic Germplasm Resources Conservation Area (Cranoglanis bouderius: helmet catfish; Hemitrygon akajei: whip stingray)
Hainan
Xisha Dongdao Waters National Aquatic Germplasm Resources Conservation Area
Wanquanhe National Aquatic Germplasm Resources Conservation Area
Chongqing
"Four Major Domestic Carps" National Aquatic Germplasm Resources Conservation Area at Chongqing Section of Yangtze River
Jialingjiang Hechuan Section National Aquatic Germplasm Resources Conservation Area
Sichuan
Endemic Fishes National Aquatic Germplasm Resources Conservation Area at Upper Yellow River (trans-provincial NAGRCA, shared with Gansu and Qinghai)
Datongjianghe Rock Carp National Aquatic Germplasm Resources Conservation Area [Procypris rabaudi]
Qijiang Yellow Catfish National Aquatic Germplasm Resources Conservation Area
Qujiang Tachysurus fulvidraco et Onychostoma simum National Aquatic Germplasm Resources Conservation Area (Tachysurus fulvidraco: yellow catfish)
Jialingjiang Procypris rabaudi et Spinibarbus sinensis National Aquatic Germplasm Resources Conservation Area (Procypris rabaudi: rock carp)
Zijiang National Aquatic Germplasm Resources Conservation Area
Yilonghe Endemic Fishes National Aquatic Germplasm Resources Conservation Area
Mengxihe Endemic Fishes National Aquatic Germplasm Resources Conservation Area
Tonghe Endemic Fishes National Aquatic Germplasm Resources Conservation Area
Jialingjiang Nanbu Section National Aquatic Germplasm Resources Conservation Area
Gouxihe Endemic Fishes National Aquatic Germplasm Resources Conservation Area
Longtanhe Endemic Fishes National Aquatic Germplasm Resources Conservation Area
Bahe Endemic Fishes National Aquatic Germplasm Resources Conservation Area
Houhe Endemic Fishes National Aquatic Germplasm Resources Conservation Area
Elongate Loach and Largefin Longbarbel Catfish National Aquatic Germplasm Resources Conservation Area at Yuechi Section of River Qujiang [Leptobotia elongata]
Enyanghe Chinese Softshell Turtle National Aquatic Germplasm Resources Conservation Area
Lijiahe Wild-type Goldfish National Aquatic Germplasm Resources Conservation Area
Endemic Fishes National Aquatic Germplasm Resources Conservation Area at Jiange Section of River Xihe
Nanhe Onychostoma simum et Pseudobagrus vachellii National Aquatic Germplasm Resources Conservation Area (Pseudobagrus vachellii: darkbarbel catfish)
Jiaojiahe Schizothorax davidi National Aquatic Germplasm Resources Conservation Area
Qingjianghe Endemic Fishes National Aquatic Germplasm Resources Conservation Area
Minjiang Chinese Longsnout Catfish National Aquatic Germplasm Resources Conservation Area
Yingtouhe Endemic Fishes National Aquatic Germplasm Resources Conservation Area
Laixihe Topmouth Culter and Mongolian Redfin National Aquatic Germplasm Resources Conservation Area
Bahe Procypris rabaudi et Bangana rendahli National Aquatic Germplasm Resources Conservation Area (Procypris rabaudi: rock carp)
Xiaoshuihe National Aquatic Germplasm Resources Conservation Area
Dahonghehe National Aquatic Germplasm Resources Conservation Area
Kaijiang National Aquatic Germplasm Resources Conservation Area
Zhenxihe Chinese Large-mouth Catfish and Topmouth Culter National Aquatic Germplasm Resources Conservation Area
Chajiang National Aquatic Germplasm Resources Conservation Area
Pingtonghe Cyprinid Fishes Genus Schizothorax National Aquatic Germplasm Resources Conservation Area (incl. Schizothorax davidi & Schizothorax sinensis)
Guizhou
Jinjianghe Endemic Fishes National Aquatic Germplasm Resources Conservation Area
Mengjiang Bawanghe Endemic Fishes National Aquatic Germplasm Resources Conservation Area
Taipinghe Minxiaohe Endemic Fishes National Aquatic Germplasm Resources Conservation Area
Wuyanghe Endemic Fishes National Aquatic Germplasm Resources Conservation Area
Matihe Chinese Catfish and Yellow Catfish National Aquatic Germplasm Resources Conservation Area
Longchuanhe Pseudogyrinocheilus prochilus et Siniperca chuatsi National Aquatic Germplasm Resources Conservation Area (Siniperca chuatsi: mandarin fish)
Liuchonghe Cyprinid Fishes Genus Schizothorax National Aquatic Germplasm Resources Conservation Area (incl. Schizothorax grahami & Schizothorax kozlovi)
Youshanhe Endemic Fishes National Aquatic Germplasm Resources Conservation Area
Longdijiang Yellow Catfish and Chinese Large-mouth Catfish National Aquatic Germplasm Resources Conservation Area
Yinjianghe Pseudogyrinocheilus prochilus National Aquatic Germplasm Resources Conservation Area
Wujiang Yellow Catfish National Aquatic Germplasm Resources Conservation Area
Furongjiang Chinese Large-mouth Catfish National Aquatic Germplasm Resources Conservation Area
Wengmihe Endemic Fishes National Aquatic Germplasm Resources Conservation Area
Endemic Fishes National Aquatic Germplasm Resources Conservation Area at Jiupan Section of Beipan River
Songtaohe Endemic Fishes National Aquatic Germplasm Resources Conservation Area
Xieqiaohe Endemic Fishes National Aquatic Germplasm Resources Conservation Area
Majinghe Spinibarbus sinensis National Aquatic Germplasm Resources Conservation Area
Qingshuijiang Endemic Fishes National Aquatic Germplasm Resources Conservation Area
Ximihe Acrossocheilus yunnanensis National Aquatic Germplasm Resources Conservation Area
Furongjiang Endemic Fishes National Aquatic Germplasm Resources Conservation Area
Zuomahe Endemic Fishes National Aquatic Germplasm Resources Conservation Area
Longjianghe Spinibarbus caldwelli National Aquatic Germplasm Resources Conservation Area
Longjianghe Prenant's Schizothoracin National Aquatic Germplasm Resources Conservation Area [Schizothorax prenanti]
Darkbarbel Catfish National Aquatic Germplasm Resources Conservation Area at Huangping Section of Wuyang River
Yunnan
Mijuhe Dali Schizothoracin National Aquatic Germplasm Resources Conservation Area  [Zacco taliensis]
Nanpenghe Neolissochilus baoshanensis National Aquatic Germplasm Resources Conservation Area
Yuanjiang Carp National Aquatic Germplasm Resources Conservation Area, River Yuanjiang [Cyprinus rubrofuscus]
Binglangjiang Pseudecheneis sulcata et Pseudexostoma yunnanense National Aquatic Germplasm Resources Conservation Area (Pseudecheneis sulcata: sucker throat catfish)
Lancangjiang Pangasius micronemus, Clupisoma sinense et Wallago attu National Aquatic Germplasm Resources Conservation Area (Pangasius micronemus: shortbarbel pangasius; Wallago attu: wallago)
Dianchi National Aquatic Germplasm Resources Conservation Area
Fuxianhu Endemic Fishes National Aquatic Germplasm Resources Conservation Area
Baishuijiang Endemic Fishes National Aquatic Germplasm Resources Conservation Area
Endemic Fishes National Aquatic Germplasm Resources Conservation Area at Middle and Upper River Nujiang
Chenghaihu Endemic Fishes National Aquatic Germplasm Resources Conservation Area
Nanlahe Endemic Fishes National Aquatic Germplasm Resources Conservation Area
Gulahe Endemic Fishes National Aquatic Germplasm Resources Conservation Area
Puwenhe Endemic Fishes National Aquatic Germplasm Resources Conservation Area
Guanzhaihe Endemic Fishes National Aquatic Germplasm Resources Conservation Area
Nantinghe Downstream Section National Aquatic Germplasm Resources Conservation Area
Tibet
Pagsumco Endemic Fishes National Aquatic Germplasm Resources Conservation Area
Nyang He Endemic Fishes National Aquatic Germplasm Resources Conservation Area
Xizang Brown Trout National Aquatic Germplasm Resources Conservation Area, Yadong [Salmo trutta fario] (note: introduced from Europe by British in the 19th century)
Yarlung Zangbo Jiang Cyprinid Fishes Genus Schizothorax National Aquatic Germplasm Resources Conservation Area
Mêtog Dêrgang He Endemic Fishes National Aquatic Germplasm Resources Conservation Area
Shaanxi
Heihe Onychostoma macrolepis National Aquatic Germplasm Resources Conservation Area
Northern Snakehead National Aquatic Germplasm Resources Conservation Area at Qiachuan Section of Yellow River
Jialingjiangyuan Endemic Fishes National Aquatic Germplasm Resources Conservation Area
Wangchuanhe Endemic Fishes National Aquatic Germplasm Resources Conservation Area
Kuyuhe Endemic Fishes National Aquatic Germplasm Resources Conservation Area
Hanjiang Xixiang Section National Aquatic Germplasm Resources Conservation Area
Weihe National Aquatic Germplasm Resources Conservation Area
Huanghetan Chinese Softshell Turtle National Aquatic Germplasm Resources Conservation Area
Baohe Endemic Fishes National Aquatic Germplasm Resources Conservation Area
National Aquatic Germplasm Resources Conservation Area at Yumenkou to Sanmenxia Section of Middle Yellow River (trans-provincial NAGRCA, shared with Shanxi and Henan)
Juhe Shangyou National Aquatic Germplasm Resources Conservation Area
Danjiangyuan National Aquatic Germplasm Resources Conservation Area
Qianhe National Aquatic Germplasm Resources Conservation Area
Xushuihe National Aquatic Germplasm Resources Conservation Area
Ganyuhe Qinling Lenok National Aquatic Germplasm Resources Conservation Area [Brachymystax tsinlingensis]
Renhe Onychostoma macrolepis National Aquatic Germplasm Resources Conservation Area
Baoji Tongguanhe Qinling Lenok National Aquatic Germplasm Resources Conservation Area
Weihe Meixian Section National Aquatic Germplasm Resources Conservation Area
Xiliuhe National Aquatic Germplasm Resources Conservation Area
Huanghe Carp and Lanzhou Catfish National Aquatic Germplasm Resources Conservation Area at Longmen Section of Yellow River in Hancheng of Shaanxi [Cyprinus rubrofuscus var. Huanghe]
Gansu
Huanghe Liujiaxia Lanzhou Catfish National Aquatic Germplasm Resources Conservation Area
Endemic Fishes National Aquatic Germplasm Resources Conservation Area at Upper Yellow River (trans-provincial NAGRCA, shared with Sichuan and Qinghai)
Baishuijiang Schizothorax davidi National Aquatic Germplasm Resources Conservation Area
Taohe Wide-tooth Schizothoracin National Aquatic Germplasm Resources Conservation Area [Platypharodon extremus]
Daxiahe Yellow River Schizothoracin National Aquatic Germplasm Resources Conservation Area [Schizopygopsis pylzovi]
Yongninghe Endemic Fishes National Aquatic Germplasm Resources Conservation Area
Bailongjiang Endemic Fishes National Aquatic Germplasm Resources Conservation Area
Taohe Endemic Fishes National Aquatic Germplasm Resources Conservation Area
Huanghe Heishanxia Section National Aquatic Germplasm Resources Conservation Area
Shulehe Endemic Fishes National Aquatic Germplasm Resources Conservation Area
Taohe Dingxi Endemic Fishes National Aquatic Germplasm Resources Conservation Area
Endemic Fishes National Aquatic Germplasm Resources Conservation Area at Jingtai Section of Yellow River
Endemic Fishes National Aquatic Germplasm Resources Conservation Area at Liangdang Section of Jialing River
Yemuhe Yangshahe Endemic Fishes National Aquatic Germplasm Resources Conservation Area
Endemic Fishes National Aquatic Germplasm Resources Conservation Area at Headwaters of River Weihe
Endemic Fishes National Aquatic Germplasm Resources Conservation Area at Gannan Section of River Taohe
Gansu Tanchang National Aquatic Germplasm Resources Conservation Area 
Daxihe Chinese Softshell Turtle National Aquatic Germplasm Resources Conservation Area
Zhangjiachuan Qinling Lenok National Aquatic Germplasm Resources Conservation Area
Huanghe Gansu Pingchuan Section National Aquatic Germplasm Resources Conservation Area
Endemic Fishes National Aquatic Germplasm Resources Conservation Area at Baiyin District Section of Yellow River
Qinling Lenok National Aquatic Germplasm Resources Conservation Area, Huating
Qinghai 
Przewalski's Naked Carp National Aquatic Germplasm Resources Conservation Area, Qinghai Lake [Gymnocypris przewalskii]
Endemic Fishes National Aquatic Germplasm Resources Conservation Area at Upper Yellow River (trans-provincial NAGRCA, shared with Sichuan and Gansu)
Gyaring Hu Ngoring Hu Gymnocypris eckloni et Platypharodon extremus National Aquatic Germplasm Resources Conservation Area (Platypharodon extremus: wide-tooth schizothoracin)
Markog He Schizothorax davidi National Aquatic Germplasm Resources Conservation Area
Endemic Fishes National Aquatic Germplasm Resources Conservation Area at Jainca Section of Yellow River
Endemic Fishes National Aquatic Germplasm Resources Conservation Area at Guide Section of Yellow River
Gêqu He Endemic Fishes National Aquatic Germplasm Resources Conservation Area
Togtun He Endemic Fishes National Aquatic Germplasm Resources Conservation Area
Datonghe Endemic Fishes National Aquatic Germplasm Resources Conservation Area
Heihe Endemic Fishes National Aquatic Germplasm Resources Conservation Area
Qumar He Endemic Fishes National Aquatic Germplasm Resources Conservation Area
Golmud He National Aquatic Germplasm Resources Conservation Area
Sunmco National Aquatic Germplasm Resources Conservation Area
Yanzhangguaxia Endemic Fishes National Aquatic Germplasm Resources Conservation Area, Yushu Tibetan Autonomous Prefecture
Ningxia
Lanzhou Catfish National Aquatic Germplasm Resources Conservation Area at Zhongwei-Zhongning Section of Yellow River
Rhinogobio nasutus National Aquatic Germplasm Resources Conservation Area at Qingtongxia-Shizuishan Section of Yellow River
Xiji Zhenhu Endemic Fishes National Aquatic Germplasm Resources Conservation Area
Shahu Endemic Fishes National Aquatic Germplasm Resources Conservation Area
Huanghe Carp National Aquatic Germplasm Resources Conservation Area at Yuanzhou Section of Qingshui River
Xinjiang
Kanas Hu Endemic Fishes National Aquatic Germplasm Resources Conservation Area
Yarkant He Endemic Fishes National Aquatic Germplasm Resources Conservation Area
Ebi Hu Endemic Fishes National Aquatic Germplasm Resources Conservation Area
Ulungur Hu Endemic Fishes National Aquatic Germplasm Resources Conservation Area
Küirtix He Arctic Grayling National Aquatic Germplasm Resources Conservation Area [Thymallus arcticus]
Bosten Hu National Aquatic Germplasm Resources Conservation Area
Kaiduhe Endemic Fishes National Aquatic Germplasm Resources Conservation Area
Kaba He National Aquatic Germplasm Resources Conservation Area
Endemic Fishes National Aquatic Germplasm Resources Conservation Area at Koksu Section of Ertix River
Künes He Endemic Fishes National Aquatic Germplasm Resources Conservation Area
Tekes He Endemic Fishes National Aquatic Germplasm Resources Conservation Area
Küirtix He Endemic Fishes National Aquatic Germplasm Resources Conservation Area
Bohai Sea
Liaodongwan Bohaiwan Laizhouwan National Aquatic Germplasm Resources Conservation Area
East China Sea
Donghai Largehead Hairtail National Aquatic Germplasm Resources Conservation Area [Trichiurus lepturus]
Lüsi Yuchang Small Yellow Croaker and Silver Pomfret National Aquatic Germplasm Resources Conservation Area [Pseudosciaena polyactis]-[Pampus argenteus]
South China Sea
Beibuwan Crimson Sea Bream and Redtail Prawn National Aquatic Germplasm Resources Conservation Area [Parargyrops edita]
National Aquatic Germplasm Resources Conservation Area at Yongle Atoll Waters of Xisha Islands

National Domestic Animal Genetic Resources Conservation Areas of China
Ratified by: Ministry of Agriculture and Rural Affairs
Number of NDAGRCAs (unit): 24 (as at August 9, 2021)
Total Number of DAGRCAs (unit): TBV
Shanxi
Guangling Donkey National Conservation Area (Guangling County) 
Inner Mongolia
Inner Mongolia Cashmere Goat (Alxa Type) National Conservation Area (Alxa Left Banner)
Mongolian Horse National Conservation Area (West Ujimqin Banner)
Alxa Bactrian Camel National Conservation Area (Alxa Left Banner) 
Jilin
Chinese Honeybee (Changbai Mountains Chinese Honeybee) National Conservation Area (Ji'an City/Changbai County/Fusong County/Huadian County/Huinan County/Antu County)
Heilongjiang
Northeast China Black Bee National Conservation Area (Raohe County) 
Jiangsu
Erhualian Pig National Conservation Area (Wujin District, Changzhou City) 
Hu Sheep National Conservation Area (Wuzhong District, Suzhou City) 
Zhejiang
Hu Sheep National National Conservation Area (Wuxing District, Huzhou City)
Fujian
Jinjiang Horse National Conservation Area (Jinjiang City) 
Shandong
Chinese Honeybee (Northern Type) National Conservation Area (Feixian County/Mengyin County) 
National Bohai Black Cattle Conservation Area (revoked on August 9, 2021)
National Dezhou Donkey Conservation Area (revoked on August 9, 2021)
Hubei
Chinese Honeybee (Central China Chinese Honeybee) National Conservation Area (Shennongjia Forestry District) 
Hunan
Ningxiang Pig National Conservation Area (Ningxiang County) 
Guangdong
Chinese Honeybee (South China Chinese Honeybee) National Conservation Area (Jiaoling County) 
Guangxi
National Bose Horse Conservation Area (revoked on August 9, 2021)
Chongqing
Rongchang Pig National Conservation Area (Rongchang County) 
Sichuan
Tibetan Pig National Conservation Area (Xiangcheng County) 
Yunnan
Tibetan Pig National Conservation Area (Shangêlila County) 
Tibet
Tibetan Pig National Conservation Area (Gongbo'gyamda County) 
Pagri Yak National Conservation Area (Yadong County) 
Gansu
Tibetan Pig (Hezuo Pig) National Conservation Area (Hezuo City) 
Tianzhu White Yak National Conservation Area (Tianzhu County) 
Xinjiang
Hotan Sheep National Conservation Area (Qira County/Yutian County/Lop County) 
Xinjiang Donkey National Conservation Area (Qira County) 
Xinjiang Black Bee National Conservation Area (Nilka County)

See also
China Biosphere Reserve Network
National Cultural Ecosystem Conservation Areas of China
List of endangered and protected species of China
List of national parks of China

China
China

China geography-related lists
Nature conservation in China
Heritage registers in China
Protected areas